A complete list of introduced species for even quite small areas of the world would be dauntingly long. Humans have introduced more different species to new environments than any single document can hope to record. This list is generally for established species with truly wild populations— not kept domestically—that have been seen numerous times, and have breeding populations. While most introduced species can cause a negative impact to new environments they reach, some can have a positive impact, just for conservation purpose.

Australia

Mammals
 Platypus in Kangaroo Island
 Koala in South Australia
 Water buffalo
 Cattle
 Sheep
 Pig
 Dromedary
 Red deer from Europe
 Fallow deer from Europe
 Chital
 Indian hog deer
 Javan rusa
 Sambar deer
 Donkey
 Brumby
 Banteng
 Goat
 Brown hare
 Red fox
 Dog
 Cat
 House mouse
 Northern palm squirrel - established in Perth
 European rabbit from Europe
 Rats
 Black rat
 Brown rat

Birds
 Acridotheres tristis (common myna)
 Alauda arvensis (Eurasian skylark)
 Anas platyrhynchos (mallard)
 Cacatua galerita (sulphur-crested cockatoo) - Western Australia from east Australia
 Cacatua tenuirostris (long-billed corella) - to coastal areas from inland
 Callipepla californica (California quail)
 Carduelis carduelis (European goldfinch)
 Cereopsis novaehollandiae (Cape Barren goose) - reintroduced onto Australian islands
 Chloris chloris (European greenfinch)
 Cygnus olor (mute swan)
 Dacelo novaeguineae (laughing kookaburra) - artificially expanded range
 Dromaius novaehollandiae (emu) - reintroduced onto Australian islands
 Columba livia (feral pigeon)
 Australian brushturkey in Kangaroo Island
 Gallus gallus (red junglefowl)
 Gallus varius (green junglefowl) on Cocos (Keeling) Islands
 Padda oryzivora (Java sparrow) - Cocos (Keeling) Islands and Christmas Island 
 Lonchura punctulata (nutmeg mannikin)
 Meleagris gallopavo (wild turkey)
 Menura novaehollandiae (superb lyrebird) - Tasmania from mainland 
 Numida meleagris (helmeted guineafowl)
 Passer domesticus (house sparrow)
 Passer montanus (Eurasian tree sparrow)
 Pavo cristatus (Indian peafowl)
 Phasianus colchicus (common pheasant)
 Pycnonotus jocosus (red-whiskered bulbul)
 Spilopelia chinensis (spotted dove)
 Spilopelia senegalensis (laughing dove)
 Struthio camelus (ostrich)
 Sturnus vulgaris (common starling)
 Gang-gang cockatoo in Kangaroo Island
 Trichoglossus moluccanus (rainbow lorikeet) – to Western Australia from east Australia
 Turdus merula (Eurasian blackbird)
 Turdus philomelos (song thrush)
 Tyto novaehollandiae (Australian masked owl) - Lord Howe Island from mainland
 Zosterops natalis (Christmas white-eye) - Cocos (Keeling) Islands

Fish
 Acanthogobius flavimanus
 Asian carp
 Astronotus ocellatus (oscar)
 Brook trout
 Brown trout
 Chameleon goby
 Common carp
 Common roach
 Eastern mosquitofish
 European perch
 Goldfish
 Green swordtail
 Jack Dempsey
 Mozambique tilapia
 Pearl cichlid
 Pelmatolapia mariae (spotted tilapia)
 Pond loach
 Rainbow trout
 Rosy barb
 Rudd
 Southern platyfish/Variatus platy
 Tench
 White Cloud Mountain minnow
Siamese fighting fish

Reptiles
 House gecko
 Trachemys scripta elegans (red-eared slider)

Amphibians
 Cane toad

Arthropods
 Argentine ant
 Black Portuguese millipede
 Western honeybee
 Red imported fire ant from South America via North America
 Yellow crazy ant
 Pharaoh ant
 European wasp
 Silverleaf whitefly
 Carcinus maenas
 Paratrechina Longicornis (Longhorn crazy ant)
 Apis Cerana (Eastern Honey Bee)
 Aedes albopictus (tiger mosquito)
 Aethina tumida (small hive beetle)
 Aphis spiraecola (green citrus aphid)
 Bactrocera cucurbitae (melon fly)
 Bruchophagus roddi (alfalfa seed chalcid)
 Cerataphis lataniae (palm aphid)
 Ceratitis capitata (Mediterranean fruit fly)
 Corythucha ciliata (sycamore lace bug)
 Cryptotermes brevis (West Indian drywood termite)
 Diuraphis noxia (Russian wheat aphid)
 Forficula auricularia (common earwig)
 Frankliniella occidentalis (western flower thrips)
 Hylurgus ligniperda (red-haired pine bark beetle)
 Idioscopus nitidulus (mango leafhopper)
 Maconellicoccus hirsutus (hibiscus mealybug)
 Pheidole megacephala (coastal brown ant)
 Phylacteophaga froggatti (leafblister sawfly)
 Pineus pini (pine adelgid)
 Sitobion miscanthi (Indian grain aphid)
 Solenopsis geminata (ginger ant)
 Spodoptera litura (Oriental leafworm moth)
 Tapinoma melanocephalum (ghost ant)
 Tremex fuscicornis (tremex wasp)
 Trichomyrmex destructor (destructive trailing ant)
 Vespula vulgaris (common wasp)
 Wasmannia auropunctata (electric ant)
 Xanthogaleruca luteola (elm-leaf beetle)
 Xyleborinus saxesenii (fruit-tree pinhole borer)

Molluscs
 Asian trampsnail
 Cernuella virgata
 Cochlicella acuta
 Cochlicella barbara
 Cornu aspersum
 Maoricolpus roseus
 Theba pisana
 Deroceras invadens (tramp slug)
 Deroceras laeve (marsh slug)
 Arcuatula senhousia
 Pacific oyster
 Perna viridis

Echinoderms
 Northern Pacific seastar

Worms
 Sabella spallanzanii

Plants
Around 15% of Australia's flora is made up of introduced species. The following is a non-inclusive list of some of the more significant plant species. 

 Bridal creeper
 Patterson's curse
 Koster's curse – Clidemia hirta
 Scotch thistle
 Lantana
 Bitou bush
 Pinus radiata
 Cestrum nocturnum

British Isles and other European islands

Further information can be found at the, which has a free tool kit of resources on non-native species, including a photo gallery, ID sheets, risk assessments, projects database, case studies and resources for local action groups.

Mammals
 Grey squirrel from North America
 Greater white-toothed shrew from mainland Europe and Africa
 Erinaceus europaeus (European hedgehog) - Uist
 Feral horse from mainland Europe
 Equus asinus (donkey) - Cyprus
 Feral cat from mainland Europe
 Brown rat
 Black rat
 House mouse
 Bank vole from the UK; introduced to Ireland
 Edible dormouse from continental Europe
 Ferret from continental Europe to various islands around the British isles
 European rabbit from continental Europe
 European hare from continental Europe
 American mink from North America
 Reeves's muntjac from China
 Fallow deer from continental Europe
 Sika deer from Asia
 Water deer
 Reindeer - Iceland
 Feral goat
 Kashmir goat in Great Orme
 Bennett's wallaby from Australia
 South American coati from South America
 Striped skunk from North America
Raccoon dog

Birds

 Haliaeetus albicilla (white-tailed eagle) - reintroduced into Scotland
 Pandion haliaetus (osprey) - reintroduced into England
 Little owl from mainland Europe
 White-cheeked turaco from Africa 
 Violet turaco from Africa 
 Rose-ringed parakeet from Asia
 Monk parakeet from South America
 Tetrao urogallus (western capercaillie) - reintroduced into Scotland
 Tetrao tetrix (black grouse) - reintroduced into parts of England
 Lagopus lagopus (willow ptarmigan) - reintroduced into southern England
 Red-legged partridge
 Golden pheasant from Asia
 Common pheasant
 Anser anser (greylag goose) - reintroduced over Britain and Ireland
 Canada goose
 Barnacle goose
 Egyptian goose
 Mandarin duck from Japan
 Ruddy duck from North America
 Anser canagicus (emperor goose) - small population on Walney Island
 Cairina moschata (Muscovy duck)
 Columba livia (rock dove)
 Netta rufina (red-crested pochard)
 Acridotheres tristis (common myna) - Balearic Islands

Fish
 Zander
 Wels catfish
 Rainbow trout
 Walleye
 Bitterling
 Bluegill
 Brook trout
 Common carp
 Black bullhead
 Goldfish
 Grass carp
 Orfe
 Pumpkinseed
 Topmouth gudgeon
 Sunbleak
 Fathead minnow
 Pink salmon (humpback salmon)
 Alburnus alburnus (common bleak) Cyprus
 Gambusia holbrooki (eastern mosquitofish) Cyprus, Corsica
 Leuciscus leuciscus (common dace) Ireland
 Pseudorasbora parva (stone moroko)
 Rutilus rutilus (common roach) Ireland

Amphibians
 Alpine newt
 Midwife toad
 Yellow-bellied toad
 Marsh frog
 African clawed frog
 European tree frog
 Pelophylax esculentus (edible frog)

Reptiles
 Aesculapian snake
 European pond terrapin
 Pond slider
 Common wall lizard
 Western green lizard

Crustaceans
 Signal crayfish
 Chinese mitten crab
 Killer shrimp
 Chelicorophium curvispinum (Caspian mud shrimp)
 Elminius modestus (Australasian barnacle)
 Hemimysis anomala (bloody-red mysid)
 Orconectes virilis (Virile crayfish)

Insects
 Asian giant hornet
 Stick insects
 Aphis spiraecola (green citrus aphid) Mediterranean Islands
 Ceratitis capitata (Mediterranean fruit fly) Mediterranean Islands
 Cinara cupressi (Cypress aphid)
 Corythucha ciliata (sycamore lace bug)
 Ctenarytaina eucalypti (blue gum psyllid)
 Dreyfusia nordmannianae (silver fir adelges)
 Drosophila suzukii (spotted wing drosophila) Mediterranean Islands
 Frankliniella occidentalis (western flower thrips)
 Gilpinia hercyniae (European spruce sawfly)
 Hypogeococcus pungens (cactus mealybug) Corsica
 Icerya purchasi (cottony cushion scale)
 Thaumastocoris peregrinus (bronze bug) Sicily
 Vespula germanica (European wasp) Malta
 Vespula vulgaris (common wasp) Iceland

Butterflies and moths
 Large blue butterfly from Sweden
 Psychoides filicivora moth from the Far East
 Azalea leaf miner moth from East Asia
 Argyresthia cupressella moth from United States
 Brown house moth from Asia
 Tachystola acroxantha moth from Australia
 Coleotechnites piceaella moth from United States
 Cotoneaster webworm moth from United States
 Blastobasis adustella moth
 Blastobasis lacticolella moth
 Adoxophyles oporana moth
 Carnation tortrix
 Light brown apple moth Epiphyas postvittana from Australia
 Codling moth
 Cameraria ohridella (horse-chestnut leaf miner)
 Cydalima perspectalis (box tree moth)
 Thaumetopoea processionea (oak processionary)
 Paysandisia archon (castniid palm borer) Mediterranean Islands

Ants
 Pharaoh ant from United States
 Crematogaster scutellaris (cork ant)
 Lasius neglectus
 Linepithema humile (Argentine ant)
 Paratrechina longicornis (longhorn crazy ant)
 Pheidole megacephala (big-headed ant)
 Tapinoma melanocephalum (ghost ant)

Coleoptera (beetles)
 Harlequin ladybird (Harmonia axyridis)
 Dendroctonus micans (great spruce bark beetle)
 Diabrotica virgifera (Western corn rootworm)
 Lilioceris lilii (scarlet lily beetle)

Arachnids
 Argiope bruennichi (wasp spider)
 Euscorpius flavicaudis (European yellow-tailed scorpion)

Molluscs
 Arion vulgaris (Spanish slug)
 Brachidontes pharaonis (variable mussel) Mediterranean Islands
 Petricolaria pholadiformis (false angel wing)
 Pinctada radiata (Atlantic pearl-oyster)
 Potamopyrgus antipodarum (New Zealand mud snail)

Worms
 Arthurdendyus triangulatus (New Zealand flatworm)
 Australoplana sanguinea (Australian flatworm)
 Bothriocephalus acheilognathi (Asian tapeworm)

Other Animals
 Cordylophora caspia (euryhaline hydroid)

Plants
 American willow herb
 Autumnal crocus
 Bermuda buttercup
 Canadian pond weed
 Common field speedwell
 Evening primrose
 Floating pennywort
 Fox and cubs
 Giant hogweed
 Guernsey fleabane
 Himalayan balsam
 Hottentot fig
 Japanese knotweed
 Jewelweed
 Kudzu
 Least duckweed
 New Zealand willowherb
 Oxford ragwort
 Pigmy weed
 Purple dewplant
 Purple pitcher
 Rhododendron
 Water fern

Hawaiian Islands

Mammals
*Wild pig
 Feral goat
 Chital deer
 Mule deer
 Cattle
 Sheep
 Ovis orientalis (mouflon)
 Feral cat
 Dog
 Small Asian mongoose
 Brown rat
 Black rat
 Pacific rat
 House mouse
 Brush-tailed rock-wallaby - small population on Oahu

Birds
Primary source for this list is Robert L. Pyle and Peter Pyle, The Birds of the Hawaiian Islands unless otherwise stated

 Barn owl
 Branta sandvicensis (nene) - reintroduced onto some islands
 Anas platyrhynchos (mallard) – vagrant but also introduced
 Anas wyvilliana (Hawaiian duck)  - reintroduced onto some islands
 Black swan
 Mute swan
 Cattle egret
 Wild turkey
 California quail
 Gambel's quail
 Chukar
 Black francolin
 Grey francolin
 Erckel's francolin
 Japanese quail
 Red junglefowl
 Kalij pheasant
 Common pheasant
 Green pheasant - previous considered to be a subspecies of common pheasant
 Common peafowl
 Chestnut-bellied sandgrouse
 Feral pigeon
 Spotted dove
 Zebra dove
 Mourning dove
 Rose-ringed parakeet
 Mitred parakeet
 Red-masked parakeet
 Red-crowned amazon
 Mariana swiftlet
 Eurasian skylark
 Red-vented bulbul
 Red-whiskered bulbul
 Japanese bush warbler
 White-rumped shama
 Greater necklaced laughingthrush
 Chinese hwamei
 Red-billed leiothrix
 Japanese white-eye
 Northern mockingbird
 Common myna
 Yellow-faced grassquit
 Saffron finch
 Red-crested cardinal
 Yellow-billed cardinal
 Northern cardinal
 Western meadowlark
 House finch
 Telespiza cantans (Laysan finch) - artificially expanded range
 Yellow-fronted canary
 Atlantic canary
 House sparrow
 Red-cheeked cordon-bleu
 Lavender waxbill
 Orange-cheeked waxbill
 Black-rumped waxbill
 Common waxbill
 Red avadavat
 African silverbill
 Scaly-breasted munia
 Chestnut munia
 Java sparrow

Reptiles

 Anolis sagrei (brown anole)
 Anolis carolinensis (Carolina anole)
 Chamaeleo calyptratus (veiled chameleon)
 Gehyra mutilata (four-clawed gecko)
 Hemidactylus frenatus (common House Gecko)
 Hemidactylus garnotii (Indo-Pacific gecko)
 Hemiphyllodactylus typus (Indopacific tree gecko)
 Iguana iguana (green Iguana)
 Lampropholis delicata (delicate skink)
 Lepidodactylus lugubris (mourning gecko)
 Phelsuma grandis (Madagascar giant day gecko)
 Phelsuma guimbeaui (Mauritius lowland forest day gecko)
 Phelsuma laticauda (gold dust day gecko)
 Trioceros jacksonii (Jackson's chameleon)
 Palea steindachneri (wattle-necked softshell turtle)
 Pelodiscus sinensis (Chinese softshell turtle)
 Trachemys scripta (red-eared slider)

Amphibians
Primary source for this list is Nonindigenous Aquatic Species Database unless otherwise stated.
 Common coquí
 American bullfrog
 Cane toad
 Green and black poison dart frog
 Greenhouse frog
 Japanese wrinkled frog

Fish
Primary source for this list is Nonindigenous Aquatic Species Database unless otherwise stated.
 Amatitlania nigrofasciata (convict cichlid)
 Amphilophus citrinellus (Midas cichlid)
 Amphilophus labiatus (red devil cichlid)
 Astronotus ocellatus (oscar)
 Carassius auratus (goldfish)
 Cephalopholis argus (roi)
 Channa maculata (blotched snakehead)
 Cichla ocellaris (butterfly peacock bass)
 Cichlasoma spilurum (blue-eyed cichlid)
 Clarias fuscus (whitespotted clarias)
 Corydoras aeneus (bronze corydoras)
 Ctenopharyngodon idella (grass carp)
 Cyprinus carpio (common carp)
 Dorosoma petenense (threadfin shad)
 Fundulus grandis (Gulf killifish)
 Gambusia affinis (mosquitofish)
 Gambusia holbrooki (eastern mosquitofish)
 Hemichromis elongatus (banded jewelfish)
 Herklotsichthys quadrimaculatus (bluestripe herring)
 Hypophthalmichthys molitrix (silver carp)
 Ictalurus punctatus (channel catfish)
 Lepomis cyanellus (green sunfish)
 Lepomis macrochirus (bluegill)
 Limia vittata (Cuban limia)
 Lutjanus fulvus (blacktail snapper)
 Lutjanus kasmira (bluestripe snapper)
 Micropterus dolomieu (smallmouth bass)
 Micropterus salmoides (largemouth bass)
 Misgurnus anguillicaudatus (pond loach)
 Monopterus albus (Asian swamp eel)
 Morone saxatilis (striped bass)
 Mugilogobius cavifrons (mangrove goby)
 Omobranchus ferox (gossamer blenny)
 Oncorhynchus mykiss (rainbow trout)
 Oreochromis macrochir (longfin tilapia)
 Oreochromis mossambicus (Mozambique tilapia)
 Osteomugil engeli (kanda)
 Parablennius thysanius (tasseled blenny)
 Parachromis managuensis (jaguar cichlid)
 Pelvicachromis pulcher (krib)
 Poecilia latipinna (sailfin molly)
 Poecilia reticulata (guppy)
 Pseudotropheus johannii (bluegray mbuna)
 Pterygoplichthys multiradiatus (long-fin armored catfish)
 Rocio octofasciata (Jack Dempsey)
 Salmo trutta (sea trout)
 Salvelinus fontinalis (brook trout)
 Sardinella marquesensis (marquesan sardinella)
 Sarotherodon melanotheron (blackchin tilapia)
 Thorichthys meeki (firemouth cichlid)
 Tilapia zillii (redbelly tilapia)
 Upeneus vittatus (bandedtail goatfish)
 Xenentodon cancila (freshwater garfish)
 Xiphophorus hellerii (green swordtail)
 Xiphophorus maculatus (southern platyfish)

Arthropods
* Adoretus sinicus (Chinese rose beetle)
 Aedes albopictus (tiger mosquito)
 Aethina tumida (small hive beetle)
 Aleurotrachelus atratus (palm-infesting whitefly)
 Anoplolepis gracilipes (yellow crazy ant)
 Aphis spiraecola (Spirea aphid)
 Apis mellifera (Africanized bee)
 Argulus japonicus (Japanese fishlouse)
 Aulacaspis yasumatsui (cycad aulacaspis scale)
 Bactrocera cucurbitae (melon fly) 
 Bactrocera dorsalis (oriental fruit fly)
 Bactrocera latifrons (solanaceous fruit fly)
 Blattella germanica (German cockroach)
 Cactoblastis cactorum (cactus moth)
 Callinectes sapidus (blue crab)
 Cerataphis lataniae (palm aphid)
 Ceratitis capitata (Mediterranean fruit fly)
 Chilo suppressalis (striped rice stem borer)
 Chthamalus proteus
 Coptotermes formosanus (Formosan subterranean termite)
 Cryptotermes brevis (powderpost termite)
 Culex quinquefasciatus (southern house mosquito)
 Darna pallivitta (nettle caterpillar)
 Drosophila suzukii (spotted wing drosophila)
 Elatobium abietinum (green spruce aphid)
 Epiphyas postvittana (light brown apple moth)
 Euwallacea fornicatus (tea shot-hole borer)
 Exomala orientalis (oriental beetle)
 Frankliniella occidentalis (western flower thrips)
 Glycaspis brimblecombei (red gum lerp psyllid)
 Homarus americanus (American lobster)
 Hypogeococcus pungens (cactus mealybug)
 Icerya purchasi (cottony cushion scale)
 Isometrus maculatus (lesser brown scorpion)
 Lernaea cyprinacea (anchor worm)
 Linepithema humile (Argentine ant)
 Litopenaeus vannamei (whiteleg shrimp)
 Maconellicoccus hirsutus (pink hibiscus mealybug)
 Macrobrachium lar (Tahitian prawn)
 Macrobrachium rosenbergii (giant river prawn)
 Monomorium pharaonis (pharaoh ant)
 Mythimna unipuncta (rice armyworm)
 Neocaridina davidi (cherry shrimp)
 Neolecanium cornuparvum (magnolia scale)
 Nesticella mogera (cave-dwelling spider)
 Opogona sacchari (banana moth)
 Oryctes rhinoceros (coconut rhinoceros beetle)
 Paratrechina longicornis (crazy ant)
 Pheidole megacephala (big-headed ant)
 Pineus pini (pine woolly aphid)
 Procambarus clarkii (red swamp crayfish)
 Pseudaulacaspis pentagona (mulberry scale)
 Pseudococcus viburni (obscure mealybug)
 Quadrastichus erythrinae (erythrina gall wasp)
 Schistocerca nitens (gray bird grasshopper)
 Sepedomerus macropus (liverfluke snail predator fly)
 Sepedon aenescens (snail-killing fly)
 Simosyrphus grandicornis (common hover fly)
 Solenopsis papuana (Papuan thief ant)
 Sophonia orientalis (two-spotted leafhopper)
 Tapinoma melanocephalum (ghost ant)
 Trichomyrmex destructor (Singapore ant)
 Varroa destructor (Varroa mite)
 Vespula pensylvanica (western yellowjacket)
 Wasmannia auropunctata (little fire ant)
 Xyleborinus saxesenii (fruit-tree pinhole borer)
 Xylocopa sonorina (Sonoran carpenter bee)
 Xylosandrus compactus (shot-hole borer)
 Xylosandrus crassiusculus (Asian ambrosia beetle)
 Xylosandrus germanus (black timber bark beetle)
 Xylosandrus morigerus (brown twig beetle)

Plants
 Canoe plants

Other species
 Corbicula fluminea - Asian clam
 Cornu aspersum (common garden snail)
 Euglandina rosea (rosy predator snail)
 Limax maximus (leopard slug)
 Magallana gigas (Pacific oyster)
 Mytilus galloprovincialis (Mediterranean mussel)
 Pomacea bridgesii - spike-topped apple snail
 Pomacea canaliculata - channeled applesnail
 Lophopodella carteri - freshwater bryozoan
 Plumatella repens - a bryozoan
 Carijoa riisei (snowflake coral)
 Phyllorhiza punctata (Australian spotted jellyfish)

New Zealand

Mammals

 Common brushtail possum from Australia
 Cat from Europe
 Deer:
Red deer from Europe
Elk
Sika deer from Asia
Rusa deer from Asia
White-tailed deer from North America
Fallow deer
Sambar deer 
 Donkeys: the Ponui donkey from Europe
 Cattle from Europe
 Goat from Europe
 Sheep
 European hare from Europe
 Horse from Europe
 European hedgehog from Europe
 Himalayan tahr from Himalaya
 Chamois from Europe
 Pig
 Rabbit from Europe
 Rats:
 Brown and black rats from Europe
 Pacific rat (kiore) from Pacific islands
 House mouse
 Least weasel from Europe
 Stoat from Europe
Ferret from Europe
 Wallabies:
 Parma wallaby - population on Kawau Island
 Red-necked wallaby
 Swamp wallaby - population on Kawau Island
 Tammar wallaby

Birds
 Acanthis flammea (common redpoll)
 Acridotheres tristis (common myna) from India
 Alauda arvensis (Eurasian skylark)
 Alectoris chukar (chuckor)
 Anas platyrhynchos (mallard)
 Anser anser (greylag goose)
 Athene noctua (little owl)
 Branta canadensis (Canada goose)
 Cacatua galerita (sulphur-crested cockatoo)
 Eolophus roseicapilla (galah)
 Callipepla californica (Californian quail)
 Carduelis carduelis (European goldfinch)
 Chloris chloris (European greenfinch)
 Colinus virginianus (bobwhite quail).
 Columba livia (rock dove)
 Corvus frugilegus (rook)
 Coturnix ypsilophora (brown quail)
 Cygnus olor (mute swan)
 Dacelo novaeguineae (laughing kookaburra)
 Emberiza cirlus (cirl bunting)
 Emberiza citrinella (yellowhammer)
 Fringilla coelebs (chaffinch)
 Gymnorhina tibicen (magpie) from Australia
 Meleagris gallopavo (wild turkey)
 Passer domesticus (house sparrow) from UK
 Pavo cristatus (Indian peafowl)
 Phasianus colchicus (common pheasant) from Asia
 Platycercus elegans (crimson rosella)
 Platycercus eximius (eastern rosella)
 Prunella modularis (dunnock, hedge sparrow or hedge accentor) from Europe
 Spilopelia chinensis (spotted dove)
 Sturnus vulgaris (starling) from Europe
 Turdus merula (common blackbird) from Europe
 Turdus philomelos (song thrush) from Europe

Reptiles
 Lampropholis delicata (delicate skink)

Amphibians
 Green and golden bell frog
 Southern bell frog

Fish
 Brown trout
 Salmon
 Catfish
 Gambusia affinis (western mosquitofish)
 Scardinius erythrophthalmus (common rudd)

Insects
 Monarch butterfly from US
 Common housefly from Europe
 Honey bee from Europe
 Polistes chinensis (Asian paper wasp)
 Polistes humilis (common paper wasp)
 Vespula germanica (European wasp)
 Vespula vulgaris (common wasp)

Arachnids
 Varroa destructor (Varroa mite)
 Redback spider (from Australia)

Other Animals
 Didemnum vexillum (carpet sea squirt)

Plants
Up to 26,000 plants have been introduced into New Zealand.  This list is a few of the more common and more invasive species.

 Gorse from Scotland
 Common broom – Cytisus scoparius
 Blackberry
 Lupin
 Ragwort
 Scotch thistle
 Californian thistle – Cirsium arvense
 Mistflower – Ageratina riparia
 Kahili ginger – Hedychium gardnerianum
 Japanese honeysuckle
 Old man's beard - Clematis vitalba

United States and Canada

Mammals
 Equus asinus (feral donkey) from Europe
 Equus caballus (feral horse) from Europe (known as mustangs)
Feral camel from Egypt, Turkey and Tunisia
 Ammotragus lervia (Barbary sheep) from Africa
 Antilope cervicapra (blackbuck) in Texas
 Bison bison (American bison) in California
 Bos taurus (feral cattle) from Europe
 Boselaphus tragocamelus (nilgai) in Texas
 Capra aegagrus (feral goat, bezoar ibex) from Europe
 Hemitragus jemlahicus (Himalayan tahr) from Asia (in New Mexico)
 Ovis aries (feral sheep) from Europe
Ovis aries musimon
 Oryx gazella (gemsbok) in New Mexico
 Sus scrofa (wild boar) from Europe
 Phacochoerus (warthog) from Africa to Texas
 Deer
 Axis axis (chital) from Asia
 Cervus canadensis (American elk) in Florida
 Alces alces (moose) in Newfoundland
 Cervus elaphus (red deer) from Europe
 Cervus nippon (sika deer) from Asia
 Dama dama (fallow deer) From Europe
 Rusa unicolor (sambar deer) from Asia
 Canis latrans (coyote) into Florida and Georgia through introduction and natural expansion
 Canis familiaris (feral dog) from Europe
 Felis silvestris (feral cat) from Europe
 Nasua narica (white-nosed coati) from South America (in Florida)
 Procyon lotor (raccoon) onto Prince Edward Island
 Lemur catta (ring-tailed lemur) from Madagascar (in St. Catherines Island, Georgia)
 Chlorocebus pygerythrus (vervet monkey) from Africa (in Florida)
 Macaca mulatta (rhesus macaque) from Asia (in Florida and South Carolina)
 Saimiri sciureus (common squirrel monkey) from South America (in Florida)
 Cricetomys gambianus (Gambian pouched rat) from Africa
 Hydrochoerus hydrochaeris (capybara) from South America (in Florida)
 Mus musculus (house mouse) from Europe
 Myocastor coypus (nutria) from South America
 Rattus norvegicus (brown rat) from Asia
 Rattus tanezumi (Asian house rat) from Asia 
 Rattus rattus (black rat) from Europe
 Sciurus aberti (Abert's squirrel) into non-native areas of Arizona
 Sciurus aureogaster (Mexican red-bellied squirrel) from Mexico (in Florida)
 Sciurus niger (fox squirrel) into western US
 Spermophilus parryii (Arctic ground squirrel) to Unalaska Island, Kavalga Island, and Umnak Island in the Aleutian Archipelago from mainland Alaska
 Lepus europaeus (European hare) From Europe
 Oryctolagus cuniculus (European rabbit) from southwest Europe and northwest Africa
 Didelphis virginiana (Virginia opossum) from Eastern USA (in California)
 Dasypus novemcinctus (nine-banded armadillo) in Florida - there has been a natural extension of the armadillo's range into the US since 1870, reaching Florida by 1970, however the Florida population originates from established introductions dating to the 1920s.

Birds
 Pitangus sulphuratus (great kiskadee) - Bermuda
 Alauda arvensis (Eurasian skylark)
 Red-whiskered bulbul from Asia (in California and Florida)
 Pycnonotus cafer (red-vented bulbul)
 Estrilda melpoda (orange-cheeked waxbill)
 Scaly-breasted munia from Asia
 Pin-tailed whydah from Africa
 House crow
 Carduelis carduelis (European goldfinch)
 Calocitta collie (black-throated magpie-jay) in California 
 Chukar from Asia
 Eurasian tree sparrow from Europe
 House finch (in the rest of mainland North America and Hawaii)
 European starling from Europe
 Shiny cowbird from South America
 Common hill myna
 Common myna
 Gray partridge from Europe
 Himalayan snowcock from Asia, in Nevada
 House sparrow from Europe
 Spot-breasted oriole
 Budgerigar from Australia (in Florida)
 Rosy-faced lovebird from Africa
 Blue-crowned parakeet from South America (in California)
 Mitred conure from South America (in California)
 Nanday parakeet from South America
 Yellow-chevroned parakeet
 Red-masked parakeet
 Red-crowned amazon
 Lilac-crowned amazon in California
 Red-lored amazon in California
 Yellow-headed amazon
 Turquoise-fronted amazon
 Monk parakeet from South America
 Rose-ringed parakeet from Africa/Asia
 White-winged parakeet from South America
 Chestnut-fronted macaw from South America (in Florida)
 Blue-and-yellow macaw in Florida from South America
 Common cardinal in California from elsewhere in North America
 Northern red bishop from Africa (in California)
 Muscovy duck from Central America and South America
 Anas platyrhynchos (mallard) - artificially expanded range
 Mandarin duck from Asia
 Bar-headed goose from Asia
 Branta canadensis (Canada goose) - reintroduced into many areas lost in North America
 Cygnus buccinator (trumpeter swan) - artificially expanded range
 Mute swan from Europe
 Ortalis vetula (plain chachalaca) - to Georgia from Texas
 Bonasa umbellus (ruffed grouse) - artificially expanded range
 Francolinus francolinus (black francolin)
 Ring-necked pheasant from Asia and Europe
 Common peafowl from Asia (in California)
 Chicken from Asia
 Oreortyx pictus (mountain quail) - artificially expanded range
 Wild turkey from Eastern USA (in California)
 Callipepla squamata (scaled quail) - artificially expanded range
 Callipepla californica (California quail) - artificially expanded range
 Callipepla gambelii (Gambel's quail) - artificially expanded range
 Colinus virginianus (northern bobwhite) - artificially expanded range
 Pelecanus occidentalis (brown pelican) - reintroduced into Louisiana
 Rock pigeon from Europe
 Spotted dove from Asia (in California)
 Barbary dove/African collared dove from Africa
 Eurasian collared-dove from Europe
 Grey-headed swamphen
 Sacred ibis from Africa
 Gymnogyps californianus (California condor) - reintroduced to California and Arizona
 Falco peregrinus (peregrine falcon) - reintroduced into many areas lost in North America

Reptiles
 Spectacled caiman (in the Caribbean islands, Florida, and other states)
 Jackson's chameleon in Florida and California
 Brown anole in California, Georgia, Texas, Louisiana, Mississippi, and Alabama
 Green anole in California
 Hispaniolan green anole in Florida
 Puerto Rican crested anole in Florida
 Largehead anole in Florida
 Bark anole in Florida
 Knight anole in Florida
 Cuban green anole in Florida
 Jamaican giant anole in Florida
 Green iguana
 Brown basilisk in Florida
 Mexican spiny-tailed iguana
 Black spiny-tailed iguana in Florida
 Common agama
 Oriental garden lizard
 Common butterfly lizard in Florida
 Ashy gecko in Florida
 Ocellated gecko in Florida
 Common house gecko
 Indo-Pacific gecko
 Mediterranean house gecko in Florida and Kansas.
 Flat-tailed house gecko
 Ringed wall gecko
 Moorish wall gecko
 Tropical house gecko
 Tokay gecko
 Western green lizard in Kansas.
 Ameiva ameiva in Florida
 Cnemidophorus motaguae
 Eutropis multifasciata
 Italian wall lizard in Kansas.
 Common wall lizard (in northeast United States)
 Northern curlytail lizard in Florida
 Hispaniolan curlytail lizard in Florida
 Nile monitor (in California and Florida)
 Common snapping turtle (in nonnative parts of USA including California, Nevada, Oregon, Arizona, and other states)
 Spiny softshell turtle (in California)
 Chinese softshell turtle
 Twist-necked turtle
 Red-eared slider in California, from other parts of US
 Painted turtle - Phoenix, Arizona, and California
 Brahminy blind snake
 Elephant trunk snake
 Banded water snake into Texas and California introduced from the southern US
 Nerodia sipedon (northern watersnake) into California from native US
 Boa constrictor
 Burmese python  (in the Everglades only)

Amphibians
Primary source for this list is Nonindigenous Aquatic Species Database unless otherwise stated.
 Pacific tree frog in Alaska
 Greenhouse frog
 Cuban tree frog
 Eastern tiger salamander into California, Nevada and Arizona from native areas of the US
 Common mudpuppy (in Maine and other Northeastern states)
 American bullfrog (in California, Arizona, Utah, non-native parts of Colorado and Nebraska, Oregon, Washington, Hawaii, and Nantucket island)
 Cane toad (in Florida only)
 Northern red-legged frog (in Alaska only)
 African clawed frog (in California and Arizona only)
 Eleutherodactylus coqui (common coquí)

Fish
Primary source for this list is Nonindigenous Aquatic Species Database unless otherwise stated.
 Acanthogobius flavimanus (Oriental goby) from Japan (in California and Florida)
 Alosa pseudoharengus (Alewife) (in Great Lakes)
 Amatitlania nigrofasciata (convict cichlid) from Central America
 Ameiurus nebulosus (brown bullhead) into western North America from eastern North America
 Amphilophus citrinellus (Midas cichlid) - Florida
 Astronotus ocellatus (oscar) from South America
 Belonesox belizanus (pike topminnow) - Florida
 Carassius auratus (goldfish) from Asia
 Channa argus (northern snakehead)
 Channa marulius (bullseye snakehead) - Florida
 Chitala ornata (clown featherback) - Florida
 Cichla ocellaris (butterfly peacock bass) from South America (in Florida) 
 Cichlasoma bimaculatum (black acara) - Florida
 Clarias batrachus (walking catfish) from Asia (in Florida)
 Coptodon zillii (redbelly tilapia)
 Ctenopharyngodon idella (grass carp) from Asia
 Cyprinella lutrensis (red shiner) from Mississippi River basin into non-native areas
 Cyprinus carpio (common carp) from Europe
 Gambusia holbrooki (eastern mosquitofish) - from eastern US to non-native areas
 Gramma loreto (royal gramma) - Florida
 Gymnocephalus cernua (Eurasian ruffe) from Eurasia
 Hemichromis letourneuxi (African jewelfish) - Florida
 Zebrafish - from Asia
 Heros severus (banded cichlid) - Florida
 Heterotilapia buttikoferi (zebra tilapia) - Florida
 Hoplosternum littorale (tamuatá) - Florida
 Hypomesus nipponensis (wakasagi) - California
 Hypophthalmichthys molitrix (silver carp) from Asia
 Hypophthalmichthys nobilis (bighead carp) from China
 Hypostomus plecostomus (suckermouth catfish) - Texas: misidentification, it concerns Pterygoplichthys species
 Hypsoblennius invemar (tessellated blenny)
 Ictalurus furcatus (blue catfish) - from Mississippi River basin into non-native areas
 Ictalurus punctatus (channel catfish) - from central North America into non-native areas
 Ictiobus cyprinellus (bigmouth buffalo) - from the Eastern United States to California
 Leuciscus idus (ide)
 Lepomis cyanellus (green sunfish) - from central North America into non-native areas
 Macrognathus siamensis (peacock eel) - Florida
 Mayaheros urophthalmus (Mayan cichlid) from Asia (in Florida)
 Micropterus salmoides (largemouth bass) - from central North America into non-native areas
 Misgurnus anguillicaudatus (pond loach) from Asia
 Monopterus albus (Asian swamp eel) from Asia
 Morone americana (white perch) - from eastern US into non-native areas
 Morone chrysops (white bass) from Oklahoma (in California)
 Mylopharyngodon piceus (black carp) from Asia
 Neogobius melanostomus (round goby) from Eurasia
 Oreochromis aureus (blue tilapia) from Africa
 Oreochromis mossambicus (Mozambique tilapia)
 Oreochromis niloticus (Nile tilapia)
 Oreochromis urolepis (Wami tilapia) - California
 Parachromis managuensis (jaguar cichlid) - Florida
 Pelmatolapia mariae (spotted tilapia) - Florida
 Petromyzon marinus (sea lamprey) (introduced into the Great Lakes through the Welland canal c. 1921)
 Poecilia mexicana (shortfin molly)
 Poecilia reticulata (guppy) from South America
 Poecilia sphenops (short-finned molly)- Montana and Nevada
 Proterorhinus semilunaris (Western tubenose goby) from Europe
 Pterois miles (common lionfish)
 Pterois volitans (red lionfish) (in Caribbean seas and shorelines on the east coast of the U.S.A only)
 Pterygoplichthys anisitsi (Paraná sailfin catfish) - Florida
 Pterygoplichthys disjunctivus (Vermiculated sailfin catfish) - Florida, North Carolina
 Pterygoplichthys multiradiatus (Orinoco sailfin catfish)- Florida
 Pterygoplichthys pardalis (leopard pleco) - North Carolina
 Rhinogobius brunneus (Amur goby) - Washington
 Rhodeus amarus (European bitterling) - New York
 Rivulus hartii (giant rivulus) - California
 Rocio octofasciata (Jack Dempsey) - South Dakota
 Sander lucioperca (zander) - North Dakota
 Sarotherodon melanotheron (blackchin tilapia) - Florida
 Scardinius erythrophthalmus (common rudd) from Europe
 Tinca tinca (tench) from Eurasia
 Trichromis salvini (Salvin's cichlid) - Florida
 Trichopsis vittata (croaking gourami) - Florida
 Tridentiger barbatus (Shokihaze goby) - California
 Tridentiger bifasciatus (Shimofuri goby) - California
 Tridentiger trigonocephalus (chameleon goby) - California
 Xiphophorus hellerii (green swordtail)
 Xiphophorus maculatus (southern platyfish)
 Xiphophorus variatus (variatus platy)

Crustaceans
Primary source for this list is Nonindigenous Aquatic Species Database unless otherwise stated.
 European green crab from Atlantic coasts of Europe and Northern Africa
 Chinese mitten crab from the coastal rivers and estuaries of the Yellow Sea
 Japanese shore crab from Japan
 Orconectes virilis (virile crayfish) native to North America, but now widespread outside its normal habitat
 Pacifastacus leniusculus (signal crayfish) into California from elsewhere in North America
 Procambarus clarkii (red swamp crawfish) now widespread in North America, from its native range in the Gulf of Mexico basin
 Spiny waterflea from northern Europe and western Russia
 Fishhook waterflea from the Ponto-Caspian region
 Daphnia lumholtzi
 Penaeus monodon
 Macrobrachium rosenbergii
 Hemimysis anomala
 Echinogammarus ischnus
 Bosmina coregoni
 Eubosmina maritima
 Argulus japonicus
 Megacyclops viridis
 Neoergasilus japonicus
 Canthocamptus hibernicus
 Nitokra incerta
 Schizopera borutzkyi 
 Thermocyclops crassus
 Amphibalanus amphitrite
 Amphibalanus improvisus (bay barnacle)
 Limnoria quadripunctata (gribble)

Mollusks
Marine
 Arcuatula senhousia (Asian date mussel)
 Crepidula fornicata (American limpet, common slipper shell) into the coasts of British Columbia and Washington state from the Western Atlantic Ocean
 Littorina littorea (common periwinkle) from Europe
 Myosotella myosotis (mouse ear snail)
 Perna viridis (Asian green mussel) - Florida
 Potamocorbula amurensis (overbite clam)
 Rapana venosa (veined rapa whelk) from the Sea of Japan
 Venerupis philippinarum (Manila clam)
Freshwater
 Bellamya chinensis (Chinese mystery snail) from Asia
 Bithynia tentaculata (mud bithynia) from Europe
 Cipangopaludina japonica (Japanese mysterysnail)
 Corbicula fluminea (Asian clam) from Asia
 Dreissena bugensis (quagga mussel) from Caspian and Black Seas
 Dreissena polymorpha (zebra mussel) from the Caspian and Black Seas
 Marisa cornuarietis (Colombian ramshorn apple snail)
 Melanoides tuberculata (red-rimmed melania) from northern Africa to southern Asia
 Pisidium amnicum (greater European peaclam)
 Pisidium henslowanum (Henslow peaclam)
 Pisidium moitessierianum (pygmy peaclam)
 Pisidium supinum (humpbacked peaclam)
 Pomacea canaliculata (channeled applesnail)
 Pomacea haustrum (titan applesnail) - Florida
 Pomacea maculata (island applesnail)
 Potamopyrgus antipodarum (New Zealand mud snail) from New Zealand
 Radix auricularia (big-ear radix)
 Sphaerium corneum (European fingernailclam) from Europe
 Valvata piscinalis (European stream valvata) - Great Lakes
Terrestrial
 Cepaea hortensis (white-lipped snail) from Europe
 Cepaea nemoralis (grove snail) from Europe
 Cornu aspersum (garden snail) from Europe
 Deroceras invadens (tramp slug)
 Deroceras reticulatum (grey field slug)
 Limax maximus (leopard slug) from Europe
 Lissachatina fulica (giant African snail)
 Theba pisana (white garden snail) from Europe
 Zachrysia provisoria (Cuban brown snail)
 Xerolenta obvia (Heath Snail)

Worms
 Medicinal leech
 Ficopomatus enigmaticus - Australian tubeworm
 Dendrodrilus rubidus - trout worm
 Platydemus manokwari
 Anguillicoloides crassus (swim bladder worm)
 Bothriocephalus acheilognathi (Asian tapeworm)
 Globodera rostochiensis (golden nematode)
 Lumbricus rubellus (leaf worm)
 Lumbricus terrestris (common earthworm)

Insects

Beetles and relatives

 Mottled water hyacinth weevil from South America
 Rhinocyllus conicus (thistle-head weevil)
 Gonipterus scutellatus
 Diaprepes abbreviatus
 Asian long-horned beetle
 European chafer
 Brown spruce longhorn beetle from Europe
 Harlequin ladybug
 Emerald ash borer from Asia
 European elm bark beetle
 Elm leaf beetle
 Japanese beetle
 Paropsisterna m-fuscum
 Xyleborus glabratus
 Xyleborus dispar (pear blight beetle)
 Xyleborus similis
 Eucalyptus Longhorned Borer
 Aethina tumida (small hive beetle)
 Diabrotica virgifera (Western corn rootworm)
 Euwallacea fornicatus (Polyphagous and Kuroshio shot hole borers)
 Epitrix tuberis (tuber flea beetle)
 Lilioceris lilii (scarlet lily beetle)
 Metamasius callizona (bromeliad beetle)
 Scolytus schevyrewi (banded elm bark beetle)
 Xyleborinus saxesenii (fruit-tree pinhole borer)
 Xylosandrus compactus (black twig borer)
 Xylosandrus germanus (black timber bark beetle)

Crickets
 Southern mole cricket

Flies and allies

 Asian tiger mosquito
 Culex quinquefasciatus (southern house mosquito)
 European crane fly
 Birch leafminer
 Olive fruit fly
 Anastrepha ludens (Mexican fruit fly)
 Anastrepha suspensa (Greater Antilliean fruit fly)
 Drosophila suzukii
 Liriomyza huidobrensis
 Rhagoletis pomonella (apple maggot)

Termites
 Formosan subterranean termite
 Cryptotermes brevis (West Indian drywood termite)

Sawflies
 Larch sawfly
 European pine sawfly
 European spruce sawfly
 Diprion similis (introduced pine sawfly)

Aphids, whiteflies, and scale insects
 Hemlock woolly adelgid from Japan
 Balsam woolly adelgid
 Phorid fly from South America
 Ash whitefly
 Silverleaf whitefly
 Aleurocanthus woglumi (citrus blackfly)
 Singhiella simplex
 Aleurodicus dugesii
 Beech scale
 Saissetia oleae
 Aonidiella aurantii
 Coccus psuedomagnoliarum (citricola scale)
 Aulacaspis yasumatsui (cycad aulacaspis scale)
 Icerya purchasi (cottony cushion scale)
 Neolecanium cornuparvum (magnolia scale)
 Paratachardina pseudolobata (lobate lac scale)
 Diaphorina citri
 Glycaspis brimblecombei
 Ctenarytaina eucalypti (blue gum psyllid)
 Shivaphis celti
 Toxoptera citricida
 Aphis spiraecola (green citrus aphid)
 Cerataphis lataniae (palm aphid)
 Elatobium abietinum (green spruce aphid)
 Pineus pini (pine woolly aphid)
 Planococcus ficus
 Hypogeococcus pungens (cactus mealybug)
 Maconellicoccus hirsutus (pink hibiscus mealybug)
 Paracoccus marginatus (papaya mealybug)
 Phenacoccus solenopsis (cotton mealybug)
 Pseudococcus viburni (obscure mealybug)
 Homalodisca vitripennis (glassy-winged sharpshooter)

Ants
 Pharaoh ant from Africa
 Red imported fire ant from South America
 Black imported fire ant from Argentina
 Black-headed ant from Africa or Eurasia
 Hairy ant from Africa
 Argentine ant from Argentina
 Singapore ant from Singapore
 Floral ant from Asia
 European fire ant from Europe
 Caribbean crazy ant from Caribbean islands
 Asian needle ant from Asia
 Big-headed ant from Cameroon
 Technomyrmex albipes from Indonesia
 Electric ant from South America
 Plagiolepis alluaudi (the little yellow ant) from Madagascar

Bees

 Western honeybee from Europe
 Africanized bee from Africa and South America
 Green orchid bee from Central America to Florida

Wasps
 Vespula germanica
 Polistes dominula
 Sirex woodwasp
 Selitrichodes globulus

Moths and butterflies

 Acrolepiopsis assectella (leek moth)
 Archips fuscocupreanus (exotic leafroller moth)
 Cactoblastis cactorum (cactus moth)
 Coleophora laricella (larch casebearer)
 Crocidosema plebejana (cotton tipworm)
 Duponchelia fovealis
 Epiphyas postvittana (light brown apple moth)
 Lymantria dispar (gypsy moth) from Europe
 Operophtera brumata (winter moth)
 Opogona sacchari (banana moth)
 Phyllocnistis citrella (citrus leafminer)
 Pieris rapae (cabbage white or small white) butterfly from Europe
 Rhyacionia buoliana (European pine shoot moth)
 Thymelicus lineola (European or Essex skipper) butterfly from Europe

Other insects
 Brown marmorated stink bug from Asia
 Bagrada hilaris
 Scantius aegyptius
 Thaumastocoris peregrinus
 Pseudacysta perseae
 Taeniothrips inconsequens
 Scirtothrips dorsalis
 Scirtothrips perseae
 Frankliniella occidentalis (western flower thrips)
 Thrips palmi (melon thrips)
 Forficula auricularia (common earwig)

Arachnids
 Lesser brown scorpion from Asia
 European false widow spider from Europe
 Latrodectus geometricus
 Varroa mite from Asia
 Oligonychus perseae
 Acarapis woodi (honey bee tracheal mite)
 Aculops fuchsiae (fuchsia gall mite)
 Raoiella indica (red palm mite)

Jellyfishes
 Craspedacusta sowerbii from China
 Blackfordia virginica
 Australian spotted jellyfish from Australia

Other animals
 Cordylophora caspia - freshwater hydroid
 Lophopodella carteri - freshwater bryozoan
 Stephanella hina - bryozoan
 Diadumene lineata - orange-striped green sea anemone
 Botrylloides violaceus - a colonial sea squirt
 Botryllus schlosseri - star ascidian
 Styela clava - stalked sea squirt

Plants
This is a non-exhaustive list of some of the more significant plant species
 Ailanthus altissima – tree-of-heaven from Eurasia
 Acacia nilotica - Gum Arabic tree
 Acacia auriculiformis - Northern black wattle
 Acacia crassicarpa - Northern wattle
 Acacia saligna - Port Jackson wattle
 Acacia melanoxylon - Australian blackwood
 Schefflera actinophylla - Umbrella tree
 Falcataria moluccana -Batai wood
 Samanea saman - Rain tree
 Prunus cerasus – dwarf cherry from Eurasia
 Ficus benjamina – weeping fig from Asia
 Ficus benghalensis – banyan from Asia
 Ficus religiosa – sacred fig from Asia
 Acer platanoides – Norway maple from Europe
 Taraxacum officinale – dandelion from Europe
 Nymphaea odorata – American waterlily in California from native parts of North America
 Eurasian watermilfoil from Europe, Asia and northern Africa
 Ice plant from South Africa
 Eucalypts from Australia
 Hesperis matronalis – dame's rocket from Eurasia
 Vicia cracca – cow vetch from Eurasia
 Vicia villosa – hairy vetch from Eurasia
 Lonicera japonica – Japanese honeysuckle
 Lonicera maackii – amur honeysuckle
 Rosa multiflora – multiflora rose
 Lythrum salicaria – purple loosestrife
 Pueraria montana – kudzu (a.k.a. Pueraria lobata) from Japan
 Bambusa vulgaris - common bamboo from China
 Phyllostachys aurea - Golden bamboo
 Phyllostachys aureosulcata - Yellow groove bamboo
 Allium sativum – garlic
 Daucus carota - wild carrot
 Radish
 Allium neapolitanum - false garlic
 Celastrus orbiculatus – Oriental bittersweet
 Elaeagnus umbellata – autumn olive
 Alliaria petiolata – garlic mustard
 Hydrilla verticillata – hydrilla from India and Sri Lanka
 Trapa natans – water caltrop from Eurasia
 Eichhornia crassipes – water hyacinth from South America
 Pistia stratiotes – water lettuce from South America
 ipomoea aquatica – water spinach from India and southeast Asia
 Arundo donax – giant reed from the Mediterranean
 Conium maculatum – poison hemlock from Europe
 Salvinia molesta – giant salvinia from Brazil
 Hedera helix – english ivy from Europe
 Robinia pseudoacacia - Black locust (in non-native parts of the United States)
 Gleditsia triacanthos - Honey locust (in non-native parts of the United States)
 Fucus serratus – rockweed from Europe
 Codium fragile subsp. tomentosoides – green sea fingers
 Centaurea diffusa – diffuse knapweed
 Cytisus scoparius – Scotch broom from Europe
 Sorghum halepense – Johnson grass from Europe
 Sargassum horneri 
 Kali tragus – a tumbleweed from Eurasia
 Cynanchum louiseae (black swallow-wort)
 Reynoutria japonica (syn. Fallopia japonica) (Japanese Knotweed)

Oomycetes
 Phytophthora ramorum - the cause of sudden oak death

Central America, Caribbean islands and Mexico

Mammals
 Donkey
 Horse
 Fallow deer - Guiana Island and Barbuda
 Odocoileus virginianus (white-tailed deer) - onto several islands
 Cattle - at least Hispaniola
 Goat
 Barbary sheep - Mexico
 Nilgai - Mexico by natural colonisation from the introduced Texan population
 Pig
 Monkeys:
 Mona monkey from Africa (in Grenada)
 Green monkey (previously identified as the vervet monkey) (From Africa, In Barbados
 Stump-tailed macaque - small population on the islands in Laguna Catemaco
 Rhesus macaque - there were established populations in Puerto Rico up until 2010. There has since been an unpublicised eradication program by the Puerto Rican government, which may have been successful, which would limit the population to research establishments.
 Patas monkey from Africa (in Puerto Rico)
 Small Asian mongoose from Asia (in Caribbean islands)
 Dog
 Cat
 European rabbit - population on Clarion Island not yet eradicated
 European hare - on Barbados
 Lowland paca - on Cuba
 Red-rumped agouti - on Dominica, Grenada, and Virgin Islands
 Brown rat
 Black rat
 House mouse
 Procyon lotor (raccoon) onto Bahamas, Guadeloupe, and Martinique

Birds
 Cathartes aura (turkey vulture) Puerto Rico
 Chicken
 Numida meleagris (helmeted guineafowl)
 Alectoris chukar (chukar partridge)
 Colinus virginianus (northern bobwhite) artificially expanded range
 Colinus cristatus (crested bobwhite) artificially expanded range
 Alectoris barbara (Barbary partridge)
 Eurasian collared dove
 Feral pigeon
 European starling
 Pin-tailed whydah into Puerto Rico
 Javan myna into Puerto Rico
 Common hill myna into Puerto Rico
 Java sparrow
 Common waxbill
 Village weaver
 Passer domesticus (house sparrow)
 Euplectes afer (yellow-crowned bishop)
 Estrilda melpoda (orange-cheeked waxbill)
 Lonchura cucullata (bronze mannikin)
 Lonchura punctulata (scaly-breasted munia)
 Sicalis flaveola (saffron finch)
 Sicalis luteola (grassland yellow finch) Lesser Antilles
 Tiaris canorus (Cuban grassquit) Bahamas
 Icterus icterus (Venezuelan troupial)
 Quiscalus lugubris (Carib grackle)
 Molothrus bonariensis (shiny cowbird)
 Cockatiel
 Sulphur-crested cockatoo
 Scarlet macaw into Puerto Rico from native parts of the Americas
 Red-and-green macaw into Puerto Rico from native parts of the Americas
 Blue-and-yellow macaw into Puerto Rico from native parts of the Americas
 Orange-winged amazon
 Budgerigar
 Monk parakeet
 White-winged parakeet into Puerto Rico
 Nanday parakeet into Puerto Rico
 Green-rumped parrotlet
 Eupsittula pertinax (brown-throated parakeet) Saint Thomas, U.S. Virgin Islands
 Amazona ventralis (Hispaniolan amazon) Puerto Rico and US Virgin Is.

Reptiles
 Spectacled caiman - Cuba and Puerto Rico
 Burmese python - Puerto Rico
 Boa constrictor - Puerto Rico
 Green Anaconda - Trinidad and Tobago
 Anolis sagrei (brown anole)
 Anolis wattsi (Watts' anole)
 Trachemys scripta elegans (red-eared slider)

Amphibians
 Common coquí - U.S. Virgin Islands, Dominican Republic
 Greenhouse frog - Jamaica, Bahamas
 Cuban tree frog
 Scinax ruber - Puerto Rico, Lesser Antilles
 Cane toad
 American bullfrog

Fish
 Mozambique tilapia
 Gambusia holbrooki (eastern mosquitofish)
 Micropterus salmoides (largemouth bass)
 Xiphophorus hellerii (green swordtail)

Insects
 Leaf-cutting ant into Guadeloupe from South America
 Cactoblastis cactorum
 Aethina tumida (small hive beetle)
 Aleurocanthus woglumi (citrus blackfly)
 Aphis spiraecola (green citrus aphid)
 Aulacaspis yasumatsui (cycad aulacaspis scale)
 Cerataphis lataniae (palm aphid)
 Ceratitis capitata (Mediterranean fruit fly)
 Cryptotermes brevis (West Indian drywood termite)
 Culex quinquefasciatus (southern house mosquito)
 Frankliniella occidentalis (western flower thrips)
 Hypogeococcus pungens (cactus mealybug)
 Icerya purchasi (cottony cushion scale)
 Maconellicoccus hirsutus (pink hibiscus mealybug)
 Papilio demoleus (common lime butterfly)
 Paracoccus marginatus (papaya mealybug)
 Paratachardina pseudolobata (lobate lac scale)
 Pheidole megacephala (big-headed ant)
 Phenacoccus solenopsis (cotton mealybug)
 Phyllocnistis citrella (citrus leafminer)
 Sternochetus mangiferae (mango seed weevil)
 Tapinoma melanocephalum (ghost ant)
 Thrips palmi (melon thrips)
 Toxoptera citricida (brown citrus aphid)
 Trichomyrmex destructor (destructive trailing ant)
 Wasmannia auropunctata (electric ant)
 Xyleborinus saxesenii (fruit-tree pinhole borer)
 Xylosandrus compactus (black twig borer)
 Xylosandrus crassiusculus (Asian ambrosia beetle)
 Xylosandrus morigerus (brown twig beetle)

Arachnids
 Raoiella indica (red palm mite)
 Rhipicephalus microplus (Asian blue tick)

Worms
 Bothriocephalus acheilognathi (Asian tapeworm)
 Platydemus manokwari (New Guinea flatworm)

Crustaceans
 Amphibalanus improvisus (bay barnacle)

Mollusks
 Deroceras invadens (tramp slug)
 Deroceras laeve (marsh slug)
 Euglandina rosea (rosy wolfsnail)
 Lissachatina fulica (giant African snail)
 Marisa cornuarietis (Colombian ramshorn apple snail)
 Melanoides tuberculata (red-rimmed melania)
 Pomacea canaliculata (channeled applesnail)
 Zachrysia provisoria (Cuban brown snail)

South America

Mammals
 Beaver from North America to Tierra del Fuego
 Muskrat
 Brown rat
 Black rat
 House mouse
 European hare from Europe to Peru, Bolivia, Paraguay, Argentina, Chile, Uruguay and Brazil
 European rabbit
 Small Asian mongoose from Asia to Venezuela, Guyana and Suriname
 American mink
 Dog
 Cat
 Chital from Asia to Argentina, Brazil, Uruguay and Chile
 Elk from North America
 Red deer from Europe
 Blackbuck from Asia to Argentina and Uruguay
 Himalayan tahr from New Zealand (originally from Asia)
 Fallow deer
 Water buffalo - at least Brazil
 Cattle
 Wild boar from Europe
 Goat
 Feral horse from Europe
 Hippopotamus from Africa to Colombia, Originally kept by Pablo Escobar

Birds
 Anas platyrhynchos (mallard)
 Anser anser (greylag goose)
 Brotogeris versicolurus (white-winged parakeet) – Peru
 Callipepla californica (California quail)
 Carduelis carduelis (European goldfinch)
 Chloris chloris (European greenfinch)
 Columba livia (rock dove)
 Estrilda astrild (common waxbill)
 Passer domesticus (house sparrow)
 Ploceus cucullatus (village weaver)
 Rhea pennata (Darwin's rhea) - introduced to Tierra del Fuego from mainland
 Shiny cowbird (shiny cowbird) – Chile
 Thraupis episcopus (blue-gray tanager) - Lima

Amphibians
 American bullfrog

Fish
 Arapaima gigas from the Amazon rivers
 Cherry barb from Sri Lanka
 Mozambique tilapia
 Pterois volitans (Red lionfish)
 Salmo trutta (Brown trout)
 Oncorhynchus mykiss (Rainbow trout)
 Oreochromis niloticus (Nile tilapia)
 Cyprinus carpio (Common carp)
 Micropterus salmoides (Largemouth bass)
 Trichogaster pectoralis (Snakeskin gourami)

Insects
 Aedes albopictus (tiger mosquito)
 Anastrepha fraterculus (South American fruit fly)
 Aphis spiraecola (green citrus aphid)
 Bemisia tabaci (silverleaf whitefly)
 Cerataphis lataniae (palm aphid)
 Ceratitis capitata (Mediterranean fruit fly)
 Cinara cupressi (cypress aphid)
 Cryptotermes brevis (West Indian drywood termite)
 Ctenarytaina eucalypti (blue gum psyllid)
 Icerya purchasi (cottony cushion scale)
 Linepithema humile (Argentine ant)
 Maconellicoccus hirsutus (hibiscus mealybug)
 Nylanderia fulva (Crazy ant)
 Phenacoccus solenopsis (cotton mealybug)

Arachnids
 Raoiella indica (red palm mite)

Crustaceans
 Carcinus maenas (shore crab)
 Charybdis hellerii (Blue Jaiba crab)
 Cherax cainii
 Cherax quadricarinatus (Australian red claw crayfish)
 Daphnia lumholtzi
 Macrobrachium rosenbergii (giant river prawn)
 Penaeus monodon (Asian tiger shrimp)
 Procambarus clarkii (red swamp crawfish)

Mollusks
 Achatina fulica (Giant African snail)
 Deroceras invadens (tramp slug)
 Deroceras laeve (marsh slug)
Cornu aspersum (Garden snail)
 Melanoides tuberculata (red-rimmed melania)

Continental Europe

Mammals
 Barbary macaque - Gibraltar (from North Africa)
 Common raccoon - (from North America)
 North African hedgehog - (from Africa)
 Raccoon dog - throughout Central and Eastern Europe into E Scandinavia (from Asia)
 European brown bear - through most of its range in mainland Europe (reintroduced)
 American mink - Spain, N. France, Belgium, The Netherlands, Scandinavia, Lithuania, Belarus, etc. (from North America)
 Egyptian mongoose - Portugal, southern Spain, island of Mljet (from North Africa)
 Small Asian mongoose - Croatia, Bosnia and Herzegovina, Serbia, Montenegro, Adriatic islands
 Common genet - from Africa to Europe
 Cat
 Deer:
 Sika deer - France, Germany, Ireland, Denmark, Poland, Austria (from Asia)
 Axis deer - Italy, Slovenia, Poland, Ukraine, Georgia, Russia east of Black Sea (from South Asia)
 White-tailed deer - S Finland (from North America)
 Chinese water deer - France (from China)
 Elk - at least one example into Italy
 Barbary sheep - Spain (from Africa)
 Ovis orientalis (mouflon) - neolithic expansion of range through semi-domestication
 Goat
 Greenland muskox - Norway, Sweden (from Greenland)
 European bison - mainland Europe (reintroduced)
 European beaver - Finland (reintroduced)
 North American beaver - Finland, Russia
 Grey squirrel - Italy, Scotland, England, Ireland (from North America)
 Finlayson's squirrel
 Pallas's squirrel
 Siberian chipmunk - France, Germany, Austria, Netherlands, Finland, England (from further east in Eurasia)
 Muskrat - E Scandinavia, W France, north to Denmark, east to Ukraine, south to N Greece
 Brown rat - throughout (from Asia)
 Black rat - throughout (from South-East Asia or China, via India and Middle East)
 House mouse - throughout (from N Iran border)
 Coypu - (from South America)
 Cottontail rabbit - Spain, France, Italy (from North America)
 Lepus europaeus (European hare) - Norway, Sweden
 Bennett's wallaby - from Australia

Birds
 Griffon vulture - in most of its range in Europe (reintroduced)
 Bubo bubo (Eurasian eagle-owl) - reintroduced into Sweden
 Sacred ibis - France (from Africa)
 Phoenicopterus chilensis (Chilean flamingo)
 Black swan - Poland, Netherlands (from Australia)
 Canada goose - N Europe (France to Scandinavia) (from North America)
 Swan goose - (from Asia)
 Bar-headed goose - UK, Netherlands
 Egyptian goose - UK, Netherlands (from Africa)
 Mandarin duck from Asia
 Ruddy duck - spreading from UK (from North America)
 Columba livia (rock dove) - into northern Europe
 Alectoris chukar (chukar partridge)
 Alectoris rufa (red-legged partridge) - into northern Europe
 Alectoris barbara (Barbary partridge)
 Perdix perdix (grey partridge) - reintroduced to many parts of Europe
 Common pheasant - throughout (from Asia)
 Northern bobwhite - C France (from North America)
 Reeves's pheasant - France, Czech Republic (from China)
 Wild turkey - Germany (from North America)
 Rose-ringed parakeet - Spain, Netherlands, Belgium, W Germany
 Monk parakeet - Italy, Slovakia (from South America)
 Common mynah - Russia (from India)
 Acridotheres cristatellus (crested myna)
 Leiothrix lutea (red-billed leiothrix)
 Ploceus cucullatus (village weaver)
 Ploceus melanocephalus (black-headed weaver)
 Euplectes afer (yellow-crowned bishop)
 Estrilda troglodytes (black-rumped waxbill)
 Euodice cantans (African silverbill)
 Common waxbill - Portugal (from Africa)
 Red avadavat - Spain, Po Delta (from India)
 Greater rhea - Germany (from South America)
 Corvus splendens (House crow)

Reptiles
 Pond slider - (from North America)
 Knight anole - (from Cuba)
 Chamaeleo chamaeleon (common chameleon)
 Chamaeleo africanus (African chameleon)
 California kingsnake - Spain
 Spur-thighed tortoise - Italy, Spain, Malta, Sardinia, Sicily, and Balaeric Islands (from Africa)
 Chinese softshell turtle - Spain (from China)

Amphibians
 Bullfrog - southern Europe (from North America)
 African clawed frog - (from Africa)
 Axolotl - in Germany 
 Newt Paramesotriton labiatus - (from Asia)

Fish
 Alburnus alburnus (common bleak)
 Ameiurus melas (black bullhead) - (from North America)
 Ameiurus nebulosus (brown bullhead) - (from North America)
 Australoheros facetus (Chameleon cichlid)
 Carassius auratus (goldfish)
 Carassius gibelio (Prussian carp)
 Cyprinus carpio (common carp)
 Esox lucius (northern pike)
 Fundulus heteroclitus (mummichog)
 Gambusia holbrooki (eastern mosquitofish) - (from North America)
 Hypophthalmichthys molitrix (silver carp) - (from East Asia)
 Hypophthalmichthys nobilis (bighead carp) - (from East Asia)
 Lepomis gibbosus (pumpkinseed) - (from North America)
 Liza haematocheilus (haarder) - (from East Asia)
 Micropterus salmoides (Largemouth Bass)
 Neogobius fluviatilis (monkey goby)
 Neogobius melanostomus (round goby)
 Oncorhynchus mykiss (rainbow trout)
 Perccottus glenii (Chinese sleeper) - (from China)
 Pseudorasbora parva (stone moroko) - (from China)
 Rutilus rutilus (common roach)
 Sander lucioperca (Sander lucioperca)
 Tridentiger trigonocephalus (chameleon goby) - (from East Asia)

Crustaceans
 Balanus improvisus (Bay barnacle)
 Cercopagis pengoi (fishhook waterflea)
 Chelicorophium curvispinum (Caspian mud shrimp)
 Elminius modestus (Australasian barnacle)
 Hemigrapsus takanoi (brush-clawed shore crab)
 Hemimysis anomala (bloody-red mysid)
 Limnomysis benedeni (Donau-Schwebgarnele)
 Limnoria lignorum (gribble)
 Orconectes limosus.
 Palaemon elegans (rockpool shrimp)
 Paralithodes camtschaticus (Red king crab) 
 Percnon gibbesi (Sally Lightfoot crab)
 Pontogammarus robustoides
 Procambarus clarkii (Louisiana crawfish)

Insects
 Adelges piceae (balsam woolly adelgid)
 Aedes albopictus (tiger mosquito)
 Aleurodicus dispersus (spiralling whitefly)
 Aphis spiraecola (green citrus aphid)
 Aromia bungii (red necked longicorn)
 Cacyreus marshalli (geranium bronze)
 Cameraria ohridella (horse-chestnut leaf miner)
 Ceratitis capitata (Mediterranean fruit fly)
 Chilo suppressalis (striped rice stem borer)
 Cinara cupressi (Cypress aphid)
 Corythucha ciliata (sycamore lace bug)
 Cryptotermes brevis (West Indian drywood termite)
 Ctenarytaina eucalypti (blue gum psyllid)
 Cydalima perspectalis (box tree moth)
 Dendroctonus micans (great spruce bark beetle)
 Diabrotica virgifera (Western corn rootworm)
 Dreyfusia nordmannianae (silver fir adelges)
 Drosophila suzukii (spotted wing drosophila)
 Dryocosmus kuriphilus (chestnut gall wasp)
 Frankliniella occidentalis (western flower thrips)
 Harmonia axyridis (Asian lady beetle)
 Hypogeococcus pungens (cactus mealybug)
 Icerya purchasi (cottony cushion scale)
 Lasius neglectus (invasive garden ant)
 Leptinotarsa decemlineata (Colorado beetle)
 Linepithema humile (Argentine ant)
 Lysiphlebus testaceipes
 Opogona sacchari (banana moth)
 Monomorium pharaonis (Pharaoh ant)
 Paratrechina longicornis (longhorn crazy ant)
 Paysandisia archon (castniid palm borer)
 Pheidole megacephala (big-headed ant)
 Phoracantha semipunctata (Australian Eucalyptus longhorn)
 Rhagoletis cingulata (eastern cherry fruit fly)
 Thaumastocoris peregrinus (bronze bug)
 Vespa velutina (Asian predatory wasp) (in France)
 Xylosandrus germanus (black timber bark beetle)

Molluscs
 Arcuatula senhousia (Asian date mussel)
 Arion vulgaris (Spanish slug)
 Brachidontes pharaonis (variable mussel)
 Corbicula fluminalis
 Corbicula fluminea (Freshwater bivalve mollusk)
 Crassostrea gigas (Pacific oyster)
 Crepidula fornicata (Common slipper shell)
 Deroceras invadens (tramp slug)
 Dreissena polymorpha (Zebra mussel)
 Dreissena rostriformis bugensis (Quagga mussel)
 Ensis directus (American jack-knife clam)
 Petricolaria pholadiformis (false angel wing)
 Pinctada radiata (Atlantic pearl-oyster)
 Rapana venosa (Veined rapa whelk)
 Sinanodonta woodiana (Chinese pond mussel)

Other Animals
 Anguillicoloides crassus (swim bladder worm)
 Bothriocephalus acheilognathi (Asian tapeworm)
 Bugula neritina (brown bryozoan)
 Cordylophora caspia (euryhaline hydroid)
 Ficopomatus enigmaticus (Australian tubeworm)
 Globodera rostochiensis (yellow potato cyst nematode)
 Lumbricus terrestris (common earthworm)
 Marenzelleria neglecta (red gilled mud worm)
 Microcosmus squamiger
 Mnemiopsis leidyi (warty comb jelly)
 Polyandrocarpa zorritensis
 Rhopilema nomadica (nomad jellyfish)
 Schizoporella errata (branching bryozoan)
 Styela clava (Stalked sea squirt)
 Tricellaria inopinata

Asia excluding Japan

Mammals
 Macaca fascicularis (crab-eating macaque) into Hong Kong
 Canis familiaris (dog)
 Felis catus (cat) from Africa
 Neogale vison (American mink) from North America
 Procyon lotor (common raccoon) from North America
 Myocastor coypus (nutria) from South America
 Ondatra zibethicus (muskrat) from North America
 Oryctolagus cuniculus (European rabbit) from Europe
 Rattus norvegicus (brown rat) onto islands from mainland Asia
 Rattus rattus (black rat)
 Ceratotherium simum (southern white rhinoceros) from Africa to China
 Equus africanus (donkey) - Sri Lanka
 Giraffa camelopardalis reticulata (reticulated giraffe) - Arabia (see Sir Bani Yas)
 Ovibos moschatus (muskox) - Russia
 Ovis aries (sheep) into Tibet

Birds
 Acridotheres cinereus (pale-bellied myna) into Borneo
 Acridotheres cristatellus (crested myna) artificially expanded range
 Acridotheres tristis (common myna) into non-native areas
 Amandava amandava (red avadavat) artificially expanded range
 Cacatua galerita (sulphur-crested cockatoo) artificially expanded range into eastern Indonesia
 Cacatua sulphurea (yellow-crested cockatoo) Hong Kong
 Corvus splendens (house crow) into non-native areas
 Eclectus roratus (eclectus parrot) artificially expanded range into eastern Indonesia
 Euodice cantans (African silverbill)
 Francolinus pintadeanus (Chinese francolin) Philippines from mainland
 Garrulax canorus (Chinese hwamei) into non-native areas
 Geopelia striata (zebra dove) artificially expanded range
 Geronticus eremita (northern bald ibis) reintroduced into Turkey
 Lonchura atricapilla (chestnut munia) Maluku Islands
 Lonchura leucogastroides (Javan munia) Singapore and S Malay Peninsula
 Padda oryzivora (Java sparrow) artificially expanded range
 Passer montanus (Eurasian tree sparrow) artificially expanded range
 Perdix dauurica (Daurian partridge) Philippines from mainland
 Psittacula krameri (rose-ringed parakeet) into Israel
 Spilopelia chinensis (spotted dove) eastern Indonesia
 Tanygnathus lucionensis (blue-naped parrot) Borneo
 Trichoglossus haematodus (coconut lorikeet) Hong Kong

Reptiles
 Common snapping turtle
 Pond slider
 Brown anole into Taiwan
 Brahminy blind snake into non-native areas
 Burmese python into Singapore

Amphibians
 Cane toad
 American bullfrog

Fish
 Arapaima gigas from South America
 Abbottina rivularis (Chinese false gudgeon) into non-native areas
 Amatitlania nigrofasciata (convict cichlid)
 Atractosteus spatula (alligator gar)
 Clarias gariepinus (African sharptooth catfish)
 Colossoma macropomum (tambaqui) from South America
 Coptodon zillii (redbelly tilapia)
 Gambusia affinis (mosquitofish)
 Gambusia holbrooki (eastern mosquitofish)
 Hemibarbus maculatus (spotted steed) into non-native areas
 Hemiculter leucisculus (sharpbelly) into Central Asia
 Ictalurus punctatus (channel catfish)
 Lepomis macrochirus (bluegill)
 Mayaheros urophthalmus (Mayan cichlid)
 Micropterus dolomieu (smallmouth bass)
 Micropterus salmoides (largemouth bass)
 Oreochromis mossambicus (Mozambique tilapia)
 Oreochromis niloticus (Nile tilapia)
 Poecilia reticulata (guppy)
 Poecilia sphenops (molly)
 Pseudorasbora parva (stone moroko) into non-native areas
 Pterygoplichthys disjunctivus (suckermouth armored catfish)
 Rhodeus ocellatus (rosy bitterling) into non-native areas
 Salvelinus fontinalis (brook trout)
 Xiphophorus hellerii (green swordtail)

Insects
 Aleurodicus dispersus (spiralling whitefly)
 Belostoma bifoveolatum (giant water bug) from South America
 Bemisia tabaci (silverleaf whitefly)
 Blattella germanica (German cockroach)
 Cameraria ohridella (horse-chestnut leaf miner)
 Ceratitis capitata (Mediterranean fruit fly)
 Chrysomya bezziana (Old World screwworm fly)
 Cinara cupressi (cypress aphid)
 Corythucha ciliata (sycamore lace bug)
 Ctenarytaina eucalypti (blue gum psyllid)
 Cydalima perspectalis (box tree moth)
 Dendroctonus micans (great spruce bark beetle)
 Dendroctonus pseudotsugae (Douglas-fir beetle)
 Frankliniella occidentalis (western flower thrips)
 Hypera postica (alfalfa weevil)
 Hyphantria cunea (fall webworm)
 Icerya purchasi (cottony cushion scale)
 Linepithema humile (Argentine ant)
 Liriomyza sativae (vegetable leaf miner)
 Lissorhoptrus oryzophilus (rice water weevil)
 Monomorium pharaonis (pharaoh ant)
 Oracella acuta (loblolly pine mealybug)
 Pheidole megacephala (big-headed ant)
 Phenacoccus manihoti (cassava mealybug)
 Phenacoccus solenopsis (cotton mealybug)
 Pineus pini (pine woolly aphid)
 Quadrastichus erythrinae (Erythrina gall wasp)
 Solenopsis geminata (fire ant)
 Solenopsis invicta (red imported fire ant)
 Spodoptera frugiperda (fall armyworm)
 Trialeurodes vaporariorum (greenhouse whitefly)
 Trichomyrmex destructor (destructive trailing ant)
 Vespa velutina (Asian predatory wasp)
 Wasmannia auropunctata (electric ant)
 Xyleborus volvulus

Other arthropods
 Latrodectus geometricus (brown widow)
 Procambarus clarkii (red swamp crawfish)
 Amphibalanus amphitrite (striped barnacle)
 Amphibalanus improvisus (bay barnacle)

Molluscs
 Ambigolimax valentianus (threeband gardenslug)
 Brachidontes pharaonis (variable mussel) into Mediterranean Sea
 Cornu aspersum (garden snail)
 Euglandina rosea (rosy wolfsnail)
 Limnoperna fortunei (golden mussel) into non-native areas
 Lissachatina fulica (giant African snail)
 Mytilopsis sallei (black-striped mussel)
 Mytilus galloprovincialis (Mediterranean mussel)
 Pinctada radiata (Atlantic pearl-oyster) into Mediterranean Sea
 Pomacea canaliculata (channeled applesnail)
 Potamopyrgus antipodarum (New Zealand mud snail)
 Rapana venosa (veined rapa whelk) into Mediterranean Sea
 Rumina decollata (decollate snail)
 Venerupis philippinarum (Manila clam) into Mediterranean Sea

Other Animals
 Molgula manhattensis (sea grapes)
 Bursaphelenchus xylophilus (pine wood nematode)
 Globodera rostochiensis (golden nematode)
 Platydemus manokwari (New Guinea flatworm)
 Ficopomatus enigmaticus (Australian tubeworm)
 Hydroides elegans
 Bugula neritina (brown bryozoan)

Japan

Mammals
 Macaca cyclopis (Formosan rock macaque) in Japan (from mainland Asia)
 Macaca mulatta (rhesus macaque) in Japan (from mainland Asia)
 Canis familiaris (dog)
 Felis catus (cat) from Africa
 Neogale vison (American mink) from North America
 Martes melampus (Japanese marten)
 Mustela itatsi (Japanese weasel)
 Mustela sibirica (Siberian weasel)
 Nyctereutes procyonoides (common raccoon dog)
 Procyon lotor (common raccoon) from North America
 Urva auropunctata (small Asian mongoose) in Japan (from mainland Asia)
 Paguma larvata (masked palm civet) in Japan (from Taiwan)
 Erinaceus amurensis (Amur hedgehog) to Japan from mainland Asia
 Pipistrellus abramus (Japanese house bat) from native parts of Japan to Hokkaido
 Crocidura dsinezumi (Dsinezumi shrew)
 Eutamias sibiricus (Siberian chipmunk)
 Mus musculus (house mouse)
 Rattus exulans (Polynesian rat)
 Rattus norvegicus (brown rat)
 Rattus rattus (black rat)
 Sciurus vulgaris (red squirrel)
 Callosciurus erythraeus (Pallas's squirrel) into Japan
 Callosciurus finlaysonii (Finlayson's squirrel) into Japan
 Myocastor coypus (nutria) from South America
 Ondatra zibethicus (muskrat) from North America
 Oryctolagus cuniculus (European rabbit) from Europe (see also Ōkunoshima, also known as Japanese rabbit island)
 Bos taurus (cattle)
 Capra aegagrus (feral goat)
 Muntiacus reevesi (Reeves's muntjac)
 Sus scrofa (wild boar)

Birds
 Acridotheres cristatellus (crested myna)
 Acridotheres tristis (common myna)
 Amandava amandava (red avadavat)
 Bambusicola thoracicus (Chinese bamboo partridge) Japan from China
 Branta canadensis (Canada goose)
 Colinus virginianus (northern bobwhite)
 Columba livia (rock dove) into Japan
 Cygnus atratus (black swan)
 Cygnus olor (mute swan) into Japan from mainland Asia
 Garrulax canorus (Chinese hwamei)
 Garrulax cineraceus (moustached laughing thrush)
 Garrulax sannio (white-browed laughing thrush)
 Gracupica contra (Asian pied starling) in Japan from mainland Asia
 Himantopus mexicanus (black-necked stilt) into Japan. Possible subspecies of the native Himantopus himantopus 
 Leiothrix lutea (red-billed leiothrix) into Japan
 Padda oryzivora (Java sparrow)
 Lonchura atricapilla (chestnut mannikin)
 Lonchura malacca (tricolored mannikin)
 Lonchura striata (white-rumped munia)
 Melopsittacus undulatus (budgerigar)
 Paroaria coronata (red-crested cardinal)
 Pavo cristatus (Indian peafowl) in Japan
 Phasianus colchicus (common pheasant) into Japan
 Pica pica (Eurasian magpie) Japan from mainland
 Psittacula alexandri (red-breasted parakeet) in Japan
 Psittacula eupatria (Alexandrine parakeet) in Japan
 Psittacula krameri (ring-necked parakeet)
 Pycnonotus jocosus (red-whiskered bulbul) in Japan
 Pycnonotus sinensis (light-vented bulbul)
 Vidua macroura (pin-tailed whydah)

Reptiles
 Chinese box turtle in Japan
 Chinese pond turtle in Japan
 Common snapping turtle
 Pond slider
 Yellow pond turtle into Japan from Taiwan
 Pelodiscus sinensis (Chinese softshell turtle)
 Carolina anole
 Gekko hokouensis (Hokou gecko)
 Hemidactylus frenatus (common house gecko)
 Hemiphyllodactylus typus (Indopacific tree gecko)
 Japalura swinhonis (Swinhoe's tree lizard)
 Lepidodactylus lugubris (mourning gecko)
 Brahminy blind snake
 Orthriophis taeniurus (beauty rat snake)
 Protobothrops elegans (elegant pitviper)
 Protobothrops mucrosquamatus (brown spotted pit viper)

Amphibians
 Cane toad
 American bullfrog
 Common tree frog into Japan from Philippines
 African clawed frog
 Chinese giant salamander into Japan from China

Fish
 Acheilognathus cyanostigma (striped bitterling)
 Acheilognathus macropterus
 Acheilognathus rhombeus (kanehira)
 Acheilognathus typus (zenitanago)
 Amatitlania nigrofasciata (convict cichlid)
 Channa argus (northern snakehead) into Japan
 Channa asiatica (small snakehead)
 Clarias batrachus (walking catfish) into at least Okinawa Island from mainland Asia
 Clarias fuscus (whitespotted clarias)
 Channa maculata (blotched snakehead)
 Coptodon zillii (redbelly tilapia)
 Ctenopharyngodon idella (grass carp)
 Cyprinus carpio (common carp)
 Danio albolineatus (pearl danio)
 Danio rerio (zebrafish)
 Gambusia affinis (mosquitofish)
 Gambusia holbrooki (eastern mosquitofish)
 Hypophthalmichthys molitrix (silver bighead)
 Hypophthalmichthys nobilis (striped bighead)
 Ictalurus punctatus (channel catfish)
 Lepomis macrochirus (bluegill)
 Macropodus ocellatus (paradise fish)
 Micropterus dolomieu (smallmouth bass)
 Micropterus salmoides (largemouth bass)
 Monopterus albus (Asian swamp eel)
 Mylopharyngodon piceus (black carp)
 Odontesthes bonariensis (Argentinian silverside)
 Oncorhynchus mykiss (rainbow trout)
 Oreochromis mossambicus (Mozambique tilapia)
 Oreochromis niloticus (Nile tilapia)
 Otopharynx lithobates
 Parambassis ranga (Indian glassy fish)
 Paramisgurnus dabryanus (kara-dojou)
 Poecilia reticulata (guppy)
 Poecilia sphenops (molly)
 Pterygoplichthys disjunctivus (suckermouth armored catfish)
 Rhodeus ocellatus (rosy bitterling)
 Salmo trutta (brown trout)
 Salvelinus fontinalis (brook trout)
 Salvelinus namaycush (lake trout)
 Silurus asotus (Amur catfish)
 Tridentiger brevispinis (numachichibu)
 Xiphophorus hellerii (green swordtail)

Insects
 Agriosphodrus dohrni
 Anoplolepis gracilipes (yellow crazy ant)
 Aromia bungii (red-necked longhorn)
 Bemisia tabaci (silverleaf whitefly)
 Blattella germanica (German cockroach)
 Bombus terrestris (buff-tailed bumblebee)
 Caverelius saccharivorus (oriental chinch bug)
 Coptotermes formosanus (Formosan subterranean termite)
 Corythucha ciliata (sycamore lace bug)
 Cylas formicarius (sweet potato weevil)
 Delta pyriforme
 Drosophila suzukii (spotted wing drosophila)
 Dryocosmus kuriphilus (chestnut gall wasp)
 Epilachna varivestis (Mexican bean beetle)
 Erionota torus (rounded palm-redeye)
 Euscepes postfasciatus (West Indian sweetpotato weevil)
 Frankliniella occidentalis (western flower thrips)
 Hestina assimilis (red ring skirt)
 Hylurgus ligniperda (red-haired pine bark beetle)
 Hypera postica (alfalfa weevil)
 Hyphantria cunea (fall webworm)
 Icerya purchasi (cottony cushion scale)
 Linepithema humile (Argentine ant)
 Liriomyza sativae (vegetable leaf miner)
 Liriomyza trifolii (serpentine leafminer)
 Lissorhoptrus oryzophilus (rice water weevil)
 Monomorium pharaonis (pharaoh ant)
 Nealsomyia rufella
 Opisthoplatia orientalis
 Paraglenea fortunei
 Parasa lepida (nettle caterpillar)
 Pheidole megacephala (big-headed ant)
 Phenacoccus solenopsis (cotton mealybug)
 Protaetia orientalis
 Quadrastichus erythrinae (Erythrina gall wasp)
 Rhabdoscelus obscurus (sugarcane weevil borer)
 Rhynchophorus ferrugineus (red palm weevil)
 Sericinus montela (sericin swallow-tail butterfly)
 Solenopsis geminata (fire ant)
 Thrips palmi (melon thrips)
 Trialeurodes vaporariorum (greenhouse whitefly)
 Unaspis yanonensis (arrowhead snow scale)
 Vespa velutina (Asian predatory wasp)
 Xyleborus volvulus
 Xylocopa tranquebarorum (Taiwanese bamboo carpenter bee)

Other Arthropods
 Aculops lycopersici (tomato russet mite)
 Latrodectus geometricus (brown widow)
 Latrodectus hasseltii (redback spider)
 Chamberlinius hualinensis
 Carcinus aestuarii (Mediterranean green crab)
 Pacifastacus leniusculus (signal crayfish)
 Procambarus clarkii (red swamp crawfish)
 Pyromaia tuberculata (tuberculate pear crab)
 Amphibalanus amphitrite (striped barnacle)
 Amphibalanus improvisus (bay barnacle)
 Megabalanus coccopoma (titan acorn barnacle)
 Crangonyx floridanus (Florida crangonyctid)

Molluscs
 Ambigolimax valentianus (threeband gardenslug)
 Corbicula fluminea (Asian clam)
 Crepidula fornicata (common slipper shell)
 Crepidula onyx (onyx slippersnail)
 Euglandina rosea (rosy wolfsnail)
 Limnoperna fortunei (golden mussel)
 Lissachatina fulica (giant African snail)
 Mytilopsis sallei (black-striped mussel)
 Mytilus galloprovincialis (Mediterranean mussel)
 Nassarius sinarus (Nassarius snail)
 Perna viridis (Asian green mussel)
 Pomacea canaliculata (channeled applesnail)
 Potamopyrgus antipodarum (New Zealand mud snail)
 Rumina decollata (decollate snail)
 Xenostrobus securis (small brown mussel)

Other Animals
 Molgula manhattensis (sea grapes)
 Polyandrocarpa zorritensis
 Bursaphelenchus xylophilus (pine wood nematode)
 Globodera rostochiensis (golden nematode)
 Platydemus manokwari (New Guinea flatworm)
 Ficopomatus enigmaticus (Australian tubeworm)
 Hydroides elegans
 Bugula neritina (brown bryozoan)

Africa

Mammals
 African elephant in Swaziland (reintroduced)
 Wild boar (native to certain parts of North Africa; introduced populations rare and concentrated in the southern part of the continent)
 Black wildebeest (in Namibia)
 Impala (in Gabon)
 Sable antelope (in Swaziland)
 Nyala (in Botswana and Namibia)
 Feral goat
 Ammotragus lervia (Barbary sheep) onto Canary Islands from mainland Africa
 Ovis orientalis (mouflon) onto Canary Islands
 European rabbit (introduced mainly to islands; native to a small area in northwestern Africa)
 European hare - on Réunion
 Indian hare
 Coypu - Kenya
 Fallow deer
 Himalayan tahr (largely eradicated)
 Rusa deer
 Red deer - South Africa
 Feral horse - see Namib Desert Horse
 Feral donkey
 Feral cat
 Feral dog
 House mouse
 Brown rat
 Black rat
 Grey squirrel (restricted to the extreme southwestern corner of the continent)
 Crab-eating macaque - Mauritius
 Small Asian mongoose - Mauritius
 Small Indian civet - Madagascar
 Asian house shrew
 Tailless tenrec - Comoros, Mauritius, Réunion, and Seychelles
 Common brown lemur from Madagascar (in the island of Mayotte)

Birds
 Acridotheres tristis (common mynah)
 Agapornis fischeri (Fischer's lovebird) - coastal Tanzania and Kenya from inland
 Agapornis personatus (yellow-collared lovebird) - Kenya from Tanzania
 Alectoris barbara (Barbary partridge) - onto Canary Islands from mainland
 Alectoris rufa (red-legged partridge)
 Amandava amandava (red avadavat)
 Anas platyrhynchos (mallard)
 Bubulcus ibis (cattle egret) – Seychelles
 Carduelis carduelis (European goldfinch) – Cape Verde
 Columba livia (rock pigeon)
 Corvus splendens (house crow)
 Coturnix coturnix (common quail) - Réunion
 Crithagra mozambica (yellow-fronted canary) - numerous islands from mainland
 Cygnus olor (mute swan) - South Africa
 Estrilda astrild (common waxbill) - numerous islands from mainland
 Foudia madagascariensis (red fody) – Indian Ocean islands from mainland
 Francolinus pintadeanus (Chinese francolin) - Mauritius
 Francolinus pondicerianus (grey francolin)
 Fringilla coelebs (chaffinch) - restricted to a few suburbs of Cape Town, a city in the southwest of South Africa
 Gallus gallus (red junglefowl)
 Geopelia striata (zebra dove)
 Padda oryzivora (Java sparrow)
 Lonchura punctulata (scaly-breasted munia)
 Oxyura jamaicensis (ruddy duck)
 Passer domesticus (house sparrow)
 Ploceus cucullatus (village weaver) - Mauritius
 Psittacula krameri (rose-ringed parakeet)
 Pycnonotus jocosus (red-whiskered bulbul)
 Quelea quelea (red-billed quelea) - on to Réunion
 Serinus canicollis (Cape canary) - Réunion
 Spilopelia chinensis (spotted dove)
 Streptopelia roseogrisea (African collared dove) - onto Canary Islands from mainland
 Sturnus vulgaris (common starling)
 Tyto alba (western barn owl)

Reptiles
 Wattle-necked softshell turtle
 Emys orbicularis (European pond turtle)
 Gehyra mutilata (stump-tailed gecko)
 Hemidactylus frenatus (common house gecko)
 Lepidodactylus lugubris (mourning gecko)
 Tarentola mauritanica (Moorish wall gecko)
 Trachemys scripta ssp. elegans (red-eared slider)
 Alligator snapping turtle - South Africa

Amphibians
 Amietophrynus gutturalis (guttural toad)

Fish
 Ctenopharyngodon idella (grass carp)
 Cyprinus carpio (common carp)
 Gambusia affinis (western mosquitofish)
 Gambusia holbrooki (eastern mosquitofish)
 Hypophthalmichthys molitrix (silver carp)
 Lates niloticus (Nile perch)
 Lepomis macrochirus (bluegill)
 Micropterus dolomieu (smallmouth bass)
 Micropterus floridanus (Florida bass)
 Micropterus punctulatus (spotted bass)
 Micropterus salmoides (largemouth bass)
 Oreochromis niloticus (Nile tilapia)
 Perca fluviatilis (European perch)
 Pterygoplichthys disjunctivus (vermiculated sailfin catfish)
 Salmo salar (Atlantic salmon)
 Tinca tinca (tench)

Crustaceans
 Carcinus maenas (European shore crab)
 Cherax quadricarinatus (redclaw crayfish)
 Limnoria quadripunctata (gribble)
 Percnon gibbesi (Sally Lightfoot crab)
 Procambarus clarkii (red swamp crawfish)
 Procambarus fallax (Marmorkrebs)

Insects
 Aedes albopictus (Asian tiger mosquito)
 Aleurodicus dispersus (spiralling whitefly)
 Aleurothrixus floccosus (woolly whitefly)
 Aleurotrachelus atratus (palm-infesting whitefly)
 Anoplolepis gracilipes (yellow crazy ant)
 Aphis spiraecola (green citrus aphid)
 Aulacaspis yasumatsui (cycad aulacaspis scale)
 Bactrocera cucurbitae (melon fly)
 Bactrocera dorsalis (Oriental fruit fly)
 Bactrocera invadens (Asian fruit fly)
 Bactrocera zonata (peach fruit fly)
 Bemisia tabaci (silverleaf whitefly)
 Cactoblastis cactorum (cactus moth)
 Ceratitis capitata (Mediterranean fruit fly)
 Ceratitis rosa (Natal fruit fly)
 Chionaspis pinifoliae (pine needle scale insect)
 Cinara cupressi (cypress aphid)
 Coptotermes formosanus (Formosan subterranean termite)
 Cosmopolites sordidus (banana root borer)
 Cryptotermes brevis (West Indian drywood termite)
 Ctenarytaina eucalypti (blue gum psyllid)
 Diuraphis noxia (Russian wheat aphid)
 Eulachnus rileyi (pine needle aphid)
 Euwallacea fornicatus (tea shot hole borer)
 Frankliniella occidentalis  (western flower thrips)
 Harmonia axyridis (Asian lady beetle)
 Hylastes ater (black pine bark beetle)
 Hylurgus ligniperda (red-haired pine bark beetle)
 Icerya purchasi (cottony cushion scale)
 Linepithema humile (Argentine ant)
 Liriomyza trifolii (American serpentine leafminer)
 Maconellicoccus hirsutus (hibiscus mealybug)
 Orthotomicus erosus (Mediterranean pine engraver)
 Phenacoccus manihoti (cassava mealybug)
 Phenacoccus solenopsis (cotton mealybug)
 Pineus pini (pine woolly aphid)
 Polistes dominula (European paper wasp)
 Prostephanus truncatus (larger grain borer)
 Pseudococcus calceolariae (Citrophilus mealybug)
 Sirex noctilio (Sirex woodwasp)
 Spodoptera frugiperda (fall armyworm)
 Technomyrmex albipes (white-footed ant) 
 Thaumastocoris peregrinus (bronze bug)
 Trialeurodes ricini (castor bean whitefly)
 Trichomyrmex destructor (destructive trailing ant)
 Vespula germanica (European wasp)
 Wasmannia auropunctata (electric ant)
 Xyleborinus saxesenii (fruit-tree pinhole borer)
 Xyleborus perforans (island pinhole borer)
 Xylosandrus compactus (black twig borer)

Molluscs
 Aplexa marmorata (marbled tadpole snail)
 Bradybaena similaris (Asian trampsnail)
 Cochlicella barbara (potbellied helicellid)
 Cornu aspersum (garden snail)
 Deroceras invadens (tramp slug)
 Deroceras laeve (marsh slug)
 Euglandina rosea (rosy wolfsnail)
 Limax flavus (yellow slug)
 Milax gagates (greenhouse slug)
 Mytilus galloprovincialis (Mediterranean mussel)
 Pinctada radiata (Gulf pearl oyster)
 Pseudosuccinea columella (mimic lymnaea)
 Semimytilus algosus (Pacific mussel)
 Tarebia granifera (quilted melania)
 Theba pisana (white garden snail)
 Zonitoides arboreus (quick gloss)

Worms
 Ficopomatus enigmaticus (Australian tubeworm)
 Boccardia proboscidea (shell worm)

Other Animals
 Ciona intestinalis (sea vase)

Plants

 Brazilian pepper tree
 Bugweed
 Camphor tree
 Spanish broom
 Prickly pear
 Stone pine
 Cluster pine
 Pampas grass
 Guava
 St John's wort
 Weeping willow
 Water hyacinth
 Acacia cyclops
 Acacia mearnsii
 Acacia saligna
 Centranthus ruber
 Eucalyptus
 Hakea
 Lantana
 Tipuana tipu

Oceania and remote islands

Mammals
 Bos taurus (cattle)
 Bubalus bubalis (water buffalo)
 Canis familiaris (dog)
 Capra aegagrus (feral goat)
 Equus africanus (donkey)
 Felis catus (feral cat)
 Urva auropunctata (small Asian mongoose) – Fiji
 Macaca fascicularis (crab-eating macaque)
 Mus musculus (house mouse)
 Mustela putorius (ferret) – Azores
 Oryctolagus cuniculus (European rabbit)
 Ovis aries (sheep)
 Rattus norvegicus (brown rat)
 Rattus rattus (black rat)
 Rusa marianna (Philippine deer)
 Sciurus carolinensis (eastern gray squirrel) - Pitcairn Islands
 Suncus murinus (Asian house shrew)
 Sus scrofa (wild boar)

Birds
 Acridotheres fuscus (jungle myna)
 Acridotheres tristis (common myna)
 Alectoris chukar (chukar partridge) - Saint Helena
 Amandava amandava (red avadavat)
 Anas acuta (northern pintail) - Île Amsterdam
 Anas platyrhynchos (mallard) - arrived naturally at Macquarie Island from introduced populations in New Zealand and Australia
 Bubulcus ibis (cattle egret) - Chagos Archipelago
 Cacatua galerita (sulphur-crested cockatoo) - Palau
 Callipepla californica (California quail) - Norfolk Island
 Chloris chloris (European greenfinch) - Azores
 Circus approximans (swamp harrier) - Tahiti
 Columba livia (rock dove)
 Corvus moneduloides (New Caledonian crow) - Maré Island
 Crithagra flaviventris (yellow canary) - Saint Helena, Ascension Island
 Dicrurus macrocercus (black drongo) - Mariana Islands
 Diuca diuca (common diuca finch) - Easter Island
 Eclectus roratus (eclectus parrot) - Palau
 Estrilda astrild (common waxbill)
 Excalfactoria chinensis (king quail) - Guam
 Foudia madagascariensis (red fody) - Chagos Archipelago, Saint Helena
 Francolinus francolinus (black francolin) - Guam
 Gallinula chloropus (common moorhen) - Saint Helena
 Gallus gallus (red junglefowl)
 Geopelia striata (zebra dove) - Saint Helena
 Gymnorhina tibicen (Australian magpie) - Fiji
 Lonchura atricapilla (chestnut munia) - Palau
 Lonchura castaneothorax (chestnut-breasted mannikin)
 Lonchura punctulata (scaly-breasted munia)
 Neochmia temporalis (red-browed finch) - French Polynesia
 Nesoenas picturatus (Malagasy turtle dove) - Chagos Archipelago
 Nothoprocta perdicaria (Chilean tinamou) - Easter Island
 Padda oryzivora (Java sparrow)
 Passer domesticus (house sparrow)
 Passer montanus (Eurasian tree sparrow)
 Phalcoboenus chimango (chimango caracara) - Easter Island
 Phasianus colchicus (common pheasant) - Saint Helena
 Platycercus elegans (crimson rosella) - Norfolk Island
 Pternistis afer (red-necked spurfowl) - Ascension Island
 Pycnonotus cafer (red-vented bulbul)
 Ramphocelus dimidiatus (crimson-backed tanager) – Tahiti
 Spilopelia chinensis (spotted dove) - New Caledonia, Fiji
 Streptopelia dusumieri (Philippine collared dove) - Mariana Islands
 Sturnus vulgaris (common starling)
 Vini kuhlii (Kuhl's lorikeet) - Kiribati
 Zosterops lateralis (silvereye) - Tahiti

Reptiles
 Boiga irregularis (brown tree snake)
 Hemidactylus frenatus (common house gecko)
 Lacerta dugesii (Madeiran wall lizard) - Azores
 Iguana iguana (green iguana) – Fiji
 Trachemys scripta (red-eared slider)

Amphibians
 Duttaphrynus melanostictus (Asian common toad) - New Guinea
 Eleutherodactylus planirostris (greenhouse frog) - Guam
 Rhinella marina (cane toad)
 Xenopus laevis (African clawed frog) - Ascension Island

Insects
 Adoretus sinicus (Chinese rose beetle)
 Aedes albopictus (tiger mosquito)
 Aleurotrachelus atratus (palm-infesting whitefly) – Samoa
 Anoplolepis gracilipes (yellow crazy ant)
 Aphis spiraecola (green citrus aphid)
 Aulacaspis yasumatsui (cycad aulacaspis scale)
 Bactrocera cucurbitae (melon fly)
 Bactrocera dorsalis (Oriental fruit fly)
 Blattella germanica (German cockroach)
 Cactoblastis cactorum (cactus moth)
 Cerataphis lataniae (palm aphid) – Guam
 Ceratitis capitata (Mediterranean fruit fly)
 Coptotermes formosanus (Formosan subterranean termite) - Marshall Islands
 Crocidosema plebejana (cotton tipworm)
 Cryptotermes brevis (West Indian drywood termite)
 Ctenarytaina eucalypti (blue gum psyllid) – Azores
 Culex quinquefasciatus (southern house mosquito)
 Euwallacea destruens
 Euwallacea fornicatus (tea shot hole borer)
 Euwallacea piceus
 Homalodisca vitripennis (glassy-winged sharpshooter) - French Polynesia
 Hylurgus ligniperda (red-haired pine bark beetle) - Saint Helena
 Icerya purchasi (cottony cushion scale)
 Kallitaxila crini (green tropiduchid) – Guam
 Linepithema humile (Argentine ant)
 Maconellicoccus hirsutus (hibiscus mealybug)
 Macrosiphum euphorbiae (potato aphid)
 Monomorium pharaonis (pharaoh ant)
 Omorgus suberosus (hide beetle)
 Orthotomicus erosus (Mediterranean pine beetle) – Fiji
 Paratrechina longicornis (longhorn crazy ant)
 Pheidole megacephala (big-headed ant)
 Phenacoccus solenopsis (cotton mealybug) - New Caledonia
 Polistes chinensis (Japanese paper wasp) - Norfolk Island
 Pseudococcus viburni (obscure mealybug)
 Quadrastichus erythrinae (Erythrina gall wasp)
 Simosyrphus grandicornis (common hover fly)
 Solenopsis geminata (tropical fire ant)
 Sophonia orientalis (two-spotted leafhopper) - French Polynesia
 Tapinoma melanocephalum (ghost ant)
 Tapinoma minutum (dwarf pedicel ant) – Cook Islands
 Trichomyrmex destructor (destructive trailing ant)
 Vespula germanica (European wasp) - Ascension Island
 Vespula vulgaris (common wasp) - Saint Helena
 Wasmannia auropunctata (electric ant) 
 Xyleborinus saxesenii (fruit-tree pinhole borer) – New Guinea
 Xyleborus perforans (island pinhole borer)
 Xyleborus similis
 Xyleborus volvulus
 Xylosandrus compactus (black twig borer)
 Xylosandrus crassiusculus (Asian ambrosia beetle)
 Xylosandrus morigerus (brown twig beetle)

Molluscs
 Cornu aspersum (garden snail)
 Deroceras invadens (tramp slug)
 Deroceras laeve (marsh slug)
 Euglandina rosea (rosy wolfsnail)
 Gonaxis kibweziensis (kibwezi gonaxis)
 Limax maximus (great grey slug)  - Saint Helena, Azores
 Lissachatina fulica (giant African snail)
 Magallana gigas (Pacific oyster)
 Mytilopsis sallei (black-striped mussel) – Fiji
 Oxychilus alliarius (garlic snail)
 Perna viridis (Asian green mussel) – Fiji
 Pinctada radiata (Atlantic pearl-oyster) – Azores
 Pomacea canaliculata (channeled applesnail) – Guam, New Guinea
 Veronicella cubensis (Cuban slug)

Worms
 Globodera rostochiensis (golden nematode) - Norfolk Island
 Platydemus manokwari (New Guinea flatworm)

See also

 Introduced species
 List of invasive species
 Invasive species in South America
 List of adventive wild plants in Israel
 Norwegian Black List
 List of introduced bird species
 List of introduced mammal species

References

 DAISIE (eds.). 2009. Handbook of Alien Species in Europe. Springer, Dordrecht. 399 p. 
 Macdonald, D. and P. Barrett (1993) Collins Field Guide: Mammals of Britain & Europe. HarperCollins, London.
 Svensson, L., P.J. Grant, K. Mullarney and D. Zetterström (1999) Collins Bird Guide. HarperCollins, London.

External links
 List of Non-native Arthropodos in North America

Ecology lists
Taxonomic lists (species)